This is an updated list of foreign players who have played for football clubs in the J.League, including division levels J1 League, J2 League, J3 League, Japan Football League, Japanese Regional Leagues and Japan Soccer League.

National flag before the name: players who have represented their national football senior team in FIFA International match and have at least one international appearance cap.
In bold: Players who still are under contract at a Japanese club.
As for dual citizen, nationality is listed under official registration.

Naturalized players
 Ko Ishikawa – Honda FC, Tokyo Verdy, Nagoya Grampus – 1989–2002
 Ademir Santos – Júbilo Iwata, Shimizu S-Pulse – 1987–1996
 Alessandro Santos – Shimizu S-Pulse, Urawa Red Diamonds, Nagoya Grampus Eight, Tochigi SC, FC Gifu – 1997–2014
 Bruno Suzuki – Albirex Niigata, FC Machida Zelvia, FC Gifu – 2009–2012, 2016
 Daishiro Yoshimura – Cerezo Osaka – 1967–1980
 Erikson Noguchipinto – Oita Trinita, Sagan Tosu, Kashiwa Reysol, Avispa Fukuoka, Chaneaule Koriyama, Nagano Parceiro – 2001–2009
 George Yonashiro – Tokyo Verdy 1972–1986
 Leonardo Moreira – Japan Soccer College, Sagan Tosu, Tokyo Verdy, Tochigi SC, Giravanz Kitakyushu, Blaublitz Akita, ReinMeer Aomori, FC Maruyasu Okazaki – 2005–2020
 Marcus Tulio Tanaka – Sanfrecce Hiroshima, Mito HollyHock, Urawa Red Diamonds, Nagoya Grampus, Kyoto Sanga – 2001–2020
 Ruy Ramos – Tokyo Verdy, Kyoto Sanga – 1977–1998
 Wagner Lopes – Yokohama F. Marinos, Kashiwa Reysol, Honda FC, Shonan Bellmare, FC Tokyo, Avispa Fukuoka – 1987–2002
 Dido Havenaar – Sanfrecce Hiroshima, Tokyo Verdy, Nagoya Grampus, Jubilo Iwata, Consadole Sapporo – 1986–1998
 Michael Fitzgerald – Albirex Niigata, Japan Soccer College, Zweigen Kanazawa, V-Varen Nagasaki, Kawasaki Frontale – 2008–
 Edwin Uehara – Urawa Red Diamonds, Sagan Tosu – 1992–1996
 Romero Frank – Mito HollyHock, Montedio Yamagata, Albirex Niigata, FC Machida Zelvia, Kagoshima United – 2011–
 Park Il-gyu – Fujieda MYFC, FC Korea, FC Ryukyu, Yokohama F. Marinos, Sagan Tosu – 2012–
 Sergio Escudero – Urawa Red Diamonds, Kyoto Sanga, Tochigi SC – 2005–2012, 2016–2020
 Daniel Schmidt – Vegalta Sendai, Roasso Kumamoto, Matsumoto Yamaga – 2014–2019

Albania 
Rudi Vata – Yokohama FC – 2003

Algeria 
Aymen Tahar – Sagan Tosu – 2016
Raïs M'Bolhi – FC Ryukyu – 2008–2009

Argentina 
Abel Luciatti – Renofa Yamaguchi – 2017
Agustin Ortega – Blaublitz Akita, Esperanza SC – 2015–
Alberto Acosta – Yokohama F. Marinos – 1996
Carlos Mayor – Avispa Fukuoka – 1994–1996
Claudio Úbeda – Tokyo Verdy – 2004
Daniel Ahmed – Consadole Sapporo – 1992
Darío Figueroa – Yokohama F. Marinos – 1996
David Bisconti – Yokohama F. Marinos, Avispa Fukuoka, Sagan Tosu – 1993–1996, 2000–2002, 2002
Diego Matias Rodriguez – JEF United Chiba – 2018
Eduardo Bustos Montoya – Avispa Fukuoka – 2000
Ezequiel Ham – FC Gifu – 2018
Félix Dalmás – Laranja Kyoto, SP Kyoto – 2010, 2011–2012, 2013
Fernando Moner – Yokohama Flügels, Yokohama FC – 1988–1991, 1993–1994, 2002–2003
Fernando Nicolas Oliva – Shimizu S-Pulse – 1996–2001
Flavio Zandoná – Avispa Fukuoka – 2000
Franco Sbuttoni – Sagan Tosu – 2017
Gustavo Zapata – Yokohama F. Marinos – 1993–1996
Héctor Enrique – Sagan Tosu, FPI Hamamatsu – 1995, 1996–1997
Hugo Maradona – Sagan Tosu, Avispa Fukuoka, Consadole Sapporo – 1992–1998
Joaquin Larrivey – JEF United Chiba – 2017–2018
Jorge Sebastián Núñez – Nagoya Grampus, Consadole Sapporo – 2005, 2006
Juan Forlín – Jubilo Iwata – 2020–2021
Leandro Desábato – Cerezo Osaka, Vegalta Sendai – 2019–2022
Leonardo Ramos –Renofa Yamaguchi – 2017
Luciano Romero – Renofa Yamaguchi FC – 2016
Luis Ojeda – JEF United Chiba – 2017
Marcelo Carracedo – Avispa Fukuoka – 1997
Marcelo Morales – Urawa Red Diamonds – 1993
Marcelo Trivisonno – Urawa Red Diamonds – 1992–1993
Marcelo Vidal – Renofa Yamaguchi – 2017
Martín Vilallonga – Avispa Fukuoka – 2001
Mauro dos Santos – Albirex Niigata – 2020
Nahuel Cisneros – Esperanza SC – 2022–
Néstor Gorosito – Yokohama F. Marinos – 1996
Nestor Omar Piccoli – Yokohama Flügels, Avispa Fukuoka – 1987–1990, 1992–1995
Nicolás Orsini – Tokushima Vortis, Fagiano Okayama – 2016–2018, 2017
Oscar Acosta – Yokohama Flügels – 1991
Osvaldo Escudero – Urawa Red Diamonds – 1991–1992
Pablo Bastianini – Yokohama F. Marinos – 2010–2011
Pablo Ortega – Esperanza SC – 2016–
Pedro Massacessi – Yokohama F. Marinos – 1995
Pedro Pasculli – Sagan Tosu – 1994
Pedro Troglio – Avispa Fukuoka – 1994–1996
Ramón Díaz – Yokohama F. Marinos – 1993–1995
Ramón Medina Bello – Yokohama F. Marinos – 1994–1995
Raul Maldonado – Yokohama F. Marinos – 2000
Sebastián Riep – Avispa Fukuoka – 1997
Sergio Batista – Sagan Tosu – 1993–1994
Sergio Escudero – Urawa Reds Diamonds – 1992
Sergio Vázquez – Avispa Fukuoka – 1997
Silvio Rudman – Yokohama F. Marinos – 1992
Victor Ferreyra – Urawa Reds Diamonds – 1993

Australia 
Adam Taggart – Cerezo Osaka – 2021–
Alex Brosque – Shimizu S-Pulse – 2011–2012
Andrew Nabbout – Urawa Red Diamonds – 2018–2019
Avraam Papadopoulos – Júbilo Iwata – 2016
Aurelio Vidmar – Sanfrecce Hiroshima – 1998–1999
Ben Halloran – V-Varen Nagasaki – 2018
Billy Celeski – Ventforet Kofu – 2016
Billy Konstantinidis – Ventforet Kofu – 2017
Chay Hews – Shonan Bellmare – 1999
Diogo Ferreira – Tochigi SC – 2018
Eddy Bosnar – JEF United Chiba, Shimizu S-Pulse – 2008–2009, 2010–2011
Graham Arnold – Sanfrecce Hiroshima – 1997–1999
Hayden Foxe – Sanfrecce Hiroshima – 1998–2000
Jade North – FC Tokyo, Consadole Sapporo – 2011, 2012
Jason Geria – JEF United Chiba – 2018–2021
Joe Caletti – Tochigi City – 2022–
Joel Griffiths – Avispa Fukuoka – 2008
Joshua Kennedy – Nagoya Grampus – 2009–2014
Lucas Neill – Omiya Ardija – 2013
Mark Milligan – JEF United Chiba – 2010–2012
Matthew Bingley – Vissel Kobe, JEF United Chiba – 1997–1998
Matthew Spiranovic – Urawa Red Diamonds – 2010–2012
Max King – Tiamo Hirakata – 2020–2021
Miloš Degenek – Yokohama F. Marinos – 2017–2018
Mitch Nichols – Cerezo Osaka – 2014–2015
Mitchell Duke – Urawa Red Diamonds, Fagiano Okayama – 2015–2018, 2021–
Mitchell Langerak – Nagoya Grampus – 2018–
Mohamed Adam – FC Imabari – 2022
Nathan Burns – FC Tokyo, FC Tokyo U-23, Sanfrecce Hiroshima – 2015–2017
Ned Zelic – Urawa Red Diamonds – 2002–2003
Oliver Bozanic – Ventforet Kofu – 2017
Phil Stubbins – Sanfrecce Hiroshima – 1999
Pierce Waring – Cerezo Osaka, Cerezo Osaka U-23 – 2018–2021
Stefan Mauk – Fagiano Okayama – 2022–
Stephen Laybutt – Shonan Bellmare – 1999
Steve Corica – Sanfrecce Hiroshima – 2000–2001
Tando Velaphi – Shonan Bellmare, Kochi United – 2016–2017, 2022–
Thomas Deng – Urawa Red Diamonds, Albirex Niigata – 2020–
Tony Popovic – Sanfrecce Hiroshima – 1997–2000
Ufuk Talay – Avispa Fukuoka – 2008

Austria 
Ivica Vastić – Nagoya Grampus – 2002–2003
Mario Haas – JEF United Chiba – 2005–2006
Michael Baur – Urawa Red Diamonds – 1997
Mladen Jutrić – Ehime FC – 2019

Barbados 
Peter Hinds – Shonan Bellmare – 1988–1989

Belarus  
Sergei Aleinikov – Gamba Osaka – 1993–1996

Belgium 
Jordy Croux – Avispa Fukuoka, Cerezo Osaka – 2021–
Kevin Oris – Kyoto Sanga – 2017
Lorenzo Staelens – Oita Trinita – 2001
Thomas Vermaelen – Vissel Kobe – 2019–2022

Bolivia 
Edivaldo Hermoza – Shonan Bellmare – 2013
Julio César Baldivieso – Yokohama F. Marinos – 1997–1998
Víctor Hugo Antelo – Shonan Bellmare – 1990

Bosnia and Herzegovina 
Albin Pelak – Cerezo Osaka – 2003
Alen Avdić – Avispa Fukuoka – 2002
Almir Turković – Cerezo Osaka – 2002
Edin Mujčin – JEF United Chiba – 2001–2002
Ivan Radeljić – Cerezo Osaka – 2004
Mirko Hrgović – Gamba Osaka, JEF United Chiba – 2001, 2008
Nermin Haskić – Omiya Ardija – 2019–2021
Rade Bogdanović – JEF United Chiba – 1997
Srđan Pecelj – Shimizu S-Pulse – 2002

Brazil

A 
Abuda – FC Gifu, Tokyo Verdy – 2012, 2014
Adaílton – Jubilo Iwata, FC Tokyo – 2015–
Adalto – Consadole Sapporo −2001
Ademilson – Yokohama F Marinos, Gamba Osaka – 2015–2020
Adhemar – Yokohama F. Marinos – 2005
Adi Rocha – Gamba Osaka – 2013
Adiel – Shonan Bellmare – 2006–2011
Adílson – Jubilo Iwata – 1987–1989
Adílson Batista – Jubilo Iwata – 1997–1999
Adriano – Shonan Bellmare – 2009
Adriano – Cerezo Osaka, Tokushima Vortis, Ventforet Kofu – 2010, 2014, 2015 
Adriano – Nagoya Grampus, Yokohama FC – 2001, 2007
Adriel – Gainare Tottori – 2019–2020
Afonso – Gamba Osaka – 2011
Agenor – SC Sagamihara – 2021–
Aílton – Kawasaki Frontale – 2001
Aílton Ferraz – Kashiwa Reysol – 1993–1994
Alair – Ventforet Kofu, Ehime FC, Kyoto Sanga – 2002–2006, 2009–2013
Alan – Giravanz Kitakyushu, Fujieda MYFC, Dezzolla Shimane, ReinMeer Aomori – 2008–2015
Alan Bahia – Vissel Kobe – 2009
Alan Cariús – Kyoto Sanga – 2022–
Alan Dotti – Montedio Yamagata – 1999
Alan Mineiro – Albirex Niigata – 2012
Alan Pinheiro – Kawasaki Frontale, Tokyo Verdy, JEF United Chiba – 2013, 2015–2020
Alberto – Ventforet Kofu – 2007
Alceu – Kashiwa Reysol, Consadole Sapporo, Montedio Yamagata – 2007–2010, 2015–2017
Alcindo – Kashima Antlers, Tokyo Verdy, Consadole Sapporo – 1993–1996
Aldro – Gamba Osaka, Yokohama Flügels, Montedio Yamagata – 1990–1997
Alemão – Kyoto Sanga – 2005–2006
Alessandro – Albirex Niigata, Kyoto Sanga – 2008, 2014
Alessandro Cambalhota – Jubilo Iwata – 1997–1998
Alê – Cerezo Osaka – 2007–2008
Alex – Oita Trinita – 1999
Alex – Kawasaki Frontale, Avispa Fukuoka, Kashiwa Reysol, JEF United Chiba, Kashima Antlers, Tokushima Vortis, Kamatamare Sanuki – 2002–2018
Alex – Ventforet Kofu – 2001
Alex – Cerezo Osaka – 1997
Alex Garcia – Omiya Ardija – 2001
Alex – Cerezo Osaka – 1997
Alex – Shonan Bellmare, Fukushima United FC, Kagoshima United, Tochigi SC – 2012, 2016–2018
Alex Henrique – Avispa Fukuoka, Thespakusatsu Gunma, Tokyo Verdy – 2009, 2010–2012
Alex Mineiro – Kashima Antlers – 2005–2006
Alex Muralha – Shonan Bellmare, Albirex Niigata – 2013, 2018
Alex Oliveira – Ventforet Kofu – 2005
Alex Rafael – Thespakusatsu Gunma – 2012
Alexandre – Avispa Fukuoka – 2006
Alexandre – Kyoto Sanga – 1996
Alexandre Balotelli – SC Sagamihara – 2016
Alexandre Finazzi – Omiya Ardija – 2003
Alexandre Goulart – Shimizu S-Pulse – 2006–2007
Alexandre Lopes – Tokyo Verdy – 2002–2003
Alexandre Torres – Nagoya Grampus – 1995–1999
Alison – Omiya Ardija – 2006–2007
Alison – Shonan Bellmare – 2015
Allan – MIO Biwako Shiga, Kamatamare Sanuki, Zweigen Kanazawa, Esperanza SC – 2008–
Allano – Ventforet Kofu – 2019
Allisson Ricardo – Matsumoto Yamaga – 2012
Almir – Shonan Bellmare – 1994–1996
Almir – Tokushima Vortis, FC Tokyo, Consadole Sapporo – 1995–1996, 1998–2001
Alvaro – Montedio Yamagata, Matsumoto Yamaga – 2018–2020
Arley – Sagan Tosu – 2005
Amaral – FC Tokyo, Shonan Bellmare, Arte Takasaki, FC Kariya – 1992–2007, 2009
Amaral – Cerezo Osaka – 2010
Amarildo – Shonan Bellmare – 2006
Amorim – Shonan Bellmare – 2015
Amoroso – Tokyo Verdy – 1992–1993
Anaílson – Tokyo Verdy – 2006
Anderson – Yokohama Flügels – 1997–1998
Anderson – Yokohama FC – 2007
Anderson Andrade – Mito HollyHock, Sagan Tosu, Shimizu S-Pulse, Yokohama FC, Roasso Kumamoto – 2006–2008, 2014–2016
Anderson Carvalho – Vissel Kobe – 2012
Anderson Chaves – Fujieda MYFC – 2023– 
Anderson Kanu – Shimizu S-Pulse – 2017
Anderson Gonzaga – Albirex Niigata, Fagiano Okayama, FC Machida Zelvia – 2011–2013
Ânderson Lima – Albirex Niigata – 2005
Anderson Lopes – Sanfrecce Hiroshima, Consadole Sapporo, Yokohama F. Marinos – 2016–2017, 2019–
Anderson Roberto da Silva Luiz – Consadole Sapporo – 2008
Anderson Silva – Albirex Niigata – 2003–2004
Andradina – Gamba Osaka, Oita Trinita, Albirex Niigata, Consadole Sapporo – 2000–2003
Andre Bahia – Shonan Bellmare – 2015–2019
André – Oita Trinita, Sagan Tosu – 2000
André – Cerezo Osaka, Tokushima Vortis – 2006–2008
André Pinto – Kyoto Sanga – 2006–2007
André Silva – Montedio Yamagata – 2009
Andrei Girotto – Kyoto Sanga – 2016
Andrey – Sanfrecce Hiroshima – 1993–1995
Andrezinho – Consadole Sapporo – 2011
Angelo – Yokohama Flügels, Kyoto Sanga, Montedio Yamagata, FC Tokyo – 1993–1998	
Anselmo Ramon – Kashiwa Reysol – 2009
Antonio – Ventforet Kofu – 2000
Antônio Carlos – Kashiwa Reysol – 1996–1997
Antônio Carlos Santos – Sanfrecce Hiroshima – 1996–1997
Apodi – Tokyo Verdy – 2011
Aragoney – Kawasaki Frontale – 2005
Argel Fucks – Tokyo Verdy – 1996–1997
Ari – Kashima Antlers – 2005
Arthur Caíke – Kashima Antlers – 2021–
Arthur Maia – Kawasaki Frontale – 2015
Arthur Silva – FC Tokyo, Yokohama FC, Kataller Toyama – 2019–
Assis – Consadole Sapporo – 1999
Ataliba – Vissel Kobe, Kyoto Sanga – 2002, 2008
Augusto – Kashima Antlers, Kawasaki Frontale – 2001–2005
Augusto – Yokohama FC, Oita Trinita, Albirex Niigata – 2006–2008
Augusto César – Matsumoto Yamaga – 2020
Axel – Cerezo Osaka – 2003

B 
Baltazar – Kyoto Sanga – 1995–1996
Baré – Omiya Ardija, Ventforet Kofu, Gamba Osaka, Shimizu S-Pulse – 2001, 2003–2008, 2013, 2015
Baron – Ventforet Kofu, JEF United Chiba, Shimizu S-Pulse, Cerezo Osaka, Kashima Antlers, Vegalta Sendai, Vissel Kobe, Avispa Fukuoka – 1996, 1998–2006
Basílio – Kashiwa Reysol, Tokyo Verdy – 1998, 2006
Bebeto – Kashima Antlers – 2000
Bentinho – Tokyo Verdy, Kashiwa Reysol, Oita Trinita, Kawasaki Frontale, Avispa Fukuoka – 1994–1995, 1998–1999, 2001–2004
Bernardo – Cerezo Osaka – 1995
Betinho – Shonan Bellmare, Kawasaki Frontale – 1993–1998
Beto – Montedio Yamagata, Albirex Niigata – 1994, 2002 
Beto – Consadole Sapporo, Sanfrecce Hiroshima – 2003–2006
Biju – Consadole Sapporo, Kyoto Sanga, Sagan Tosu, Ventforet Kofu, Mito HollyHock, Zweigen Kanazawa – 1999–2009
Bismarck – Tokyo Verdy, Kashima Antlers – 1993–2001
Boka – Thespakusatsu Gunma – 2016
Botti – Vissel Kobe – 2007–2011
Branquinho – Cerezo Osaka – 2012–2013
Brenner – Iwate Grulla Morioka – 2020–2022
Bruno – Ventforet Kofu, Gainare Tottori – 2008–2009, 2013
Bruno – FC Gifu, FC Suzuka Rampole – 2011–2012
Bruno – Kashiwa Reysol – 2007
Bruno Cabrerizo – sagan Tosu – 2003
Bruno Correa – Shonan Bellmare – 2015
Bruno Cortez – Albirex Niigata – 2015–2016
Bruno Coutinho – Tokyo Verdy – 2015
Bruno Dybal – Ventforet Kofu – 2015
Bruno Ferraz – Consadole Sapporo – 2011
Bruno Formigoni – Cerezo Osaka – 2009
Bruno Lopes – Albirex Niigata, Montedio Yamagata – 2011–2014, 2018
Bruno Mendes – Cerezo Osaka, Avispa Fukuoka – 2019–2022
Bruno Meneghel – Cerezo Osaka, Albirex Niigata, Yokohama FC – 2016, 2018
Bruno Paraíba – Ventforet Kofu – 2022
Bruno Quadros – Cerezo Osaka, Consadole Sapporo, FC Tokyo – 2005–2009
Bruno Uvini – FC Tokyo – 2021–2022
Buba – FC Imabari – 2017
Bueno – Shimizu S-Pulse, Vissel Kobe, Kashima Antlers, Tokushima Vortis – 2014–

C 
Cabore – FC Tokyo – 2008–2009
Cacá – Tokushima Vortis – 2021–
Cadu – Kawasaki Frontale – 1999
Caíco – Tokyo Verdy – 1996
Caio – Kashima Antlers – 2014–2016
Caio César – Kawasaki Frontale, V-Varen Nagasaki – 2018–
Carlão – Kashima Antlers – 2011–2012
Carlinhos Júnior – Shimizu S-Pulse – 2020–
Carlinhos – Omiya Ardija, Jubilo Iwata, Tokushima Vortis – 2012–2017
Carlos Mozer – Kashima Antlers – 1995–1996
Carlos Soares Garrit – Kashima Antlers – 1992–1993
Capitão – Tokyo Verdy – 1994
Capixaba – Cerezo Osaka – 2023–
Capone – Kyoto Sanga – 1997
Careca – Kashiwa Reysol – 1993–1996
Careca Vergilio – Ventforet Kofu, Thespakusatsu Gunma, Cerezo Osaka, Shonan Bellmare – 2004, 2007–2008
Carlos Alberto Santos – Kashima Antlers, Shimizu S-Pulse, Vissel Kobe, Thespakusatsu Gunma – 1992–2001, 2003
Cauê – Consadole Sapporo – 2007
Cauê – Omiya Ardija, Albirex Niigata, Avispa Fukuoka – 2017–2019, 2021
Celso Luis Gomes – Shimizu S-Pulse – 1993
Celso Vieira – Vegalta Sendai – 2001
Cesar Sampaio – Kashiwa Reysol, Sanfrecce Hiroshima – 2002–2004
Cezar – Sagan Tosu – 2005
Charles – Nagoya Grampus – 2017
Chika – Okinawa Kariyushi FC, Thespakusatsu Gunma – 2003–2007
Chimba – SC Sagamihara – 2016
Chiquinho – Shonan Bellmare, Oita Trinita – 2017
Christian – Omiya Ardija – 2005
Chumbinho – Kashima Antlers – 2006
Claiton – Nagoya Grampus, Consadole Sapporo – 2004–2005, 2008–2009
Claudecir – Kashima Antlers – 2003
Claudinho – Cerezo Osaka – 1997
Claudio Luiz – Shonan Bellmare, Cerezo Osaka – 1997–1999, 2001
Clayson − V-Varen Nagasaki − 2022−
Cleber – Mito HollyHock – 2000
Cléber – Kyoto Sanga – 1997
Cléber Santana – Kashiwa Reysol – 2005
Cleberson – Tokushima Vortis – 2007
Clemerson – Shimizu S-Pulse, Gamba Osaka – 2004–2005
Cléo – Kashiwa Reysol – 2013
Conrado – Nagano Parceiro – 2016
Crislan – Vegalta Sendai, Shimizu S-Pulse, Shonan Bellmare – 2017–2020
Cristian – FC Gifu – 2017
Cristiano – Tochigi SC, Ventforet Kofu, Kashiwa Reysol, V-Varen Nagasaki – 2013–
Cristiano – Iwate Grulla Morioka – 2022–

D 
Da Silva – Kashima Antlers – 2003
Da Silva Vitalino – Tokushima Vortis – 2007–2008
Daniel – Kawasaki Frontale – 2001
Daniel – Kyoto Sanga, Vissel Kobe – 1997, 2001–2002
Daniel Alves – JEF United Chiba – 2022
Daniel Carvalho – Thespakusatsu Gunma – 2010
Daniel da Silva – Tokyo Verdy – 1998
Daniel Lemos – Consadole Sapporo, FC Gifu, ReinMeer Aomori – 2011, 2013–2014
Daniel Lovinho – Thespakusatsu Gunma, Kyoto Sanga – 2013–2016
Daniel Rossi – Kawasaki Frontale – 2000
Daniel Tijolo – Ventforet Kofu, Nagoya Grampus, Oita Trinita – 2009–2016
Danilo – Kashima Antlers – 2007–2009
Danilo – FC Gifu – 2012
Danilo Gomes – Albirex Niigata – 2023–
Dankler – Vissel Kobe – 2019–2021
Davi – Tokyo Verdy – 1992
Davi – Consadole Sapporo, Nagoya Grampus, Ventforet Kofu, Matsumoto Yamaga, Giravanz Kitakyushu – 2007–2009, 2012–2018
Davi – Albirex Niigata – 2008
Davi – Consadole Sapporo, Nagoya Grampus, Ventforet Kofu, Matsumoto Yamaga, Giravanz Kitakyushu – 2007–2009, 2011–2018
David da Silva – Zweigen Kanazawa – 2016
Dawhan – Gamba Osaka – 2022–
Dedimar – Jubilo Iwata, Tokyo Verdy – 1998, 2006
Deili – Ventforet Kofu – 2001
Deivisson – Nankatsu SC – 2017–
Dellatorre – Montedio Yamagata – 2022–
Denilson – Yokohama Flügels – 1996	
Dênis Marques – Omiya Ardija – 2007–2010
Denni – Montedio Yamagata – 2004
Derlan – Oita Trinita – 2023–
Deyvid Sacconi – Vegalta Sendai – 2012
Diego – Matsumoto Yamaga, Mito HollyHock, Tokushima Vortis, Sagan Tosu, Kashiwa Reysol – 2017–
Diego Macedo – Consadole Sapporo – 2016—2017
Diego Oliveira – Kashiwa Reysol, FC Tokyo – 2016–
Diego Pituca – Kashima Antlers – 2021–
Diego Rosa – Montedio Yamagata – 2016
Diego Souza – Vissel Kobe, Kashiwa Reysol, Tokyo Verdy, Kyoto Sanga, Vegalta Sendai, Montedio Yamagata – 2005–2011, 2014–2016
Dinei – Consadole Sapporo – 1999
Dinei – Kashima Antlers, Shonan Bellmare, Ventforet Kofu, Matsumoto Yamaga – 2015–2018
Dininho – Sanfrecce Hiroshima – 2005–2006
Diogo – Vegalta Sendai – 2013
Diogo – Consadole Sapporo, Tokushima Vortis – 2011–2012
Diogo Mateus – Kawasaki Frontale – 2020
Djalminha – Shimizu S-Pulse – 1994
Doda – Vegalta Sendai – 2003
Dodi – Kashiwa Reysol – 2021–2022
Dodô – Oita Trinita – 2005
Dodô – Ehime FC, Gamba Osaka, Gainare Tottori – 2010–2012
Donizete – Tokyo Verdy – 1996
Donizete – Urawa Red Diamonds – 2001
Dorival – Matsumoto Yamaga – 2015
Douglas – Ventforet Kofu, Yokohama FC – 2012–2014
Douglas – Roasso Kumamoto – 2013
Douglas Dyanfres – Tokushima Vortis, Kyoto Sanga, Sanfrecce Hiroshima, Shimizu S-Pulse, Vissel Kobe, Kashiwa Reysol – 2010–
Douglas Grolli – Avispa Fukuoka – 2020–
Douglas Oliveira – Consadole Sapporo, Iwate Grulla Morioka – 2020–
Douglas Rinaldi – Ehime FC – 2010
Douglas Tanque – Thespakusatsu Gunma, Albirex Niigata – 2015, 2017
Douglas Vieira – Tokyo Verdy, Sanfrecce Hiroshima – 2016–
Duda – Kashiwa Reysol – 1998
Dudu – Omiya Ardija – 2009–2010
Dudu – Kashiwa Reysol, Ventforet Kofu, Avispa Fukuoka, Machida Zelvia – 2014, 2016–2022
Dudu da Silva – Kashiwa Reysol – 2016–2018
Dudu Pacheco – Júbilo Iwata, FC Imabari – 2022–
Dudu Cearense – Kashiwa Reysol – 2004
Dunga – Jubilo Iwata – 1995–1998
Dutra – Yokohama F. Marinos – 2001–2006, 2012–2014

E 
Eder – Yokohama FC – 2009–2011
Eder – Thespakusatsu Gunma – 2013–2014
Éder Ceccon – Vegalta Sendai – 2003
Éder Lima – Ventforet Kofu – 2017–2019
Éderson – Kashiwa Reysol, Nagoya Grampus – 1996–1997, 2002–2003, 2006
Éderson – Kashiwa Reysol – 2015–2018
Edigar Junio – Yokohama F. Marinos, V-Varen Nagasaki – 2019–
Edílson – Kashiwa Reysol, Nagoya Grampus – 1996–1997, 2002–2003, 2006
Edinaldo – Mito HollyHock – 2007
Edinho Baiano – Kyoto Sanga – 2000
Edinho Martins – Kashima Antlers – 1994
Edivaldo – Gamba Osaka – 1992
Edmar – Vegalta Sendai – 1995–1997
Edmilson – Oita Trinita, Vissel Kobe, Roasso Kumamoto – 2003, 2011
Edmilson – Kawasaki Frontale – 2001
Edmilson – Albirex Niigata, Urawa Red Diamonds, FC Tokyo, Cerezo Osaka – 2004–2012, 2015
Edmílson – Kyoto Sanga, Yokohama F. Marinos – 1995–1998, 2000
Edmundo – Tokyo Verdy, Urawa Red Diamonds – 2000–2002
Edno – Cerezo Osaka – 2013
Edson – Tokyo Verdy, Shonan Bellmare, Tokyo Musashino City FC – 1986–1995, 1997–2000
Edson – Consadole Sapporo – 2008
Edson Araújo – Omiya Ardija – 2003
Edu – FC Tokyo – 2014
Edu Manga – Shimizu S-Pulse – 1993
Edu Marangon – Yokohama Flügels – 1993–1994
Eduardo – Nagoya Grampus – 2008
Eduardo – Gamba Osaka – 2012
Eduardo – Gainare Tottori, Tochigi SC, Kashiwa Reysol, Kawasaki Frontale, Matsumoto Yamaga, Sagan Tosu, Yokohama F. Marinos – 2013–
Eduardo Kunde – SC Sagamihara – 2021–
Eduardo Mancha – Ventforet Kofu – 2022–
Eduardo Marques – Shonan Bellmare – 2007
Eduardo Neto – Kawasaki Frontale, Nagoya Grampus, Oita Trinita – 2016–2019, 2022
Efrain Rintaro – Kashiwa Reysol, FC Gifu, Blaublitz Akita, FC Ryukyu, Veertien Mie, ReinMeer Aomori, Suzuka Point Getters, FC Osaka – 2010–
Élber – Yokohama F. Marinos – 2021–
Eliézio – Urawa Red Diamonds, Fukushima United FC – 2005, 2018
Elivélton – Nagoya Grampus – 1993–1994
Elizeu Ferreira Marciano – Yokohama FC, Vegalta Sendai, Tokushima Vortis – 2008–2012
Elpídio Silva – Kashiwa Reysol – 1997–1998
Elsinho – Kawasaki Frontale, Shimizu S-Pulse, Tokushima Vortis – 2015–
Eltinho – Yokohama F. Marinos – 2007
Elton – JEF United Chiba – 2016–2017
Embu – Tokyo Verdy – 1995
Émerson – Shimizu S-Pulse – 2003
Émerson – Shonan Bellmare – 1995
Emerson – FC Tokyo, Shonan Bellmare – 2008, 2010
Emerson – Tokyo Verdy – 2001
Emerson Santos – Kashiwa Reysol – 2021–2022
Emerson Thome – Vissel Kobe – 2006–2007 
Enílton – Omiya Ardija – 2007
Eric – Matsumoto Yamaga – 2015
Erik – Yokohama F. Marinos – 2019–2020
Erivaldo S. – Shonan Bellmare – 2010
Euller – Tokyo Verdy, Kashima Antlers – 1998, 2002–2003
Evair – Yokohama Flügels – 1995–1996
Evaldo – FC Tokyo – 2007–2009
Evandro Paulista – FC Gifu, Oita Trinita – 2015–2016
Everaldo – Kashima Antlers – 2020–
Everton Nogueira – Yokohama F. Marinos, Kyoto Sanga – 1991–1994
Éverton Santos – Albirex Niigata – 2009
Evson Patrício – Gamba Osaka, Kamatamare Sanuki – 2014–2017
Ewerton – Urawa Red Diamonds, Vegalta Sendai – 2019–2021, 2023–
Eydison – Matsumoto Yamaga – 2012
Ezequiel – Sanfrecce Hiroshima – 2020–

F 
Fabão – Kashima Antlers – 2007
Fabiano – Kashima Antlers, Vegalta Sendai – 2000–2003
Fabinho de Jesus – Gamba Osaka, Shimizu S-Pulse – 2002, 2004
Fabinho Felix – Cerezo Osaka, Yokohama FC – 2005, 2011
Fabinho Santos – Oita Trinita, Albirex Niigata, Vegalta Sendai – 2002–2007
Fábio – Fukushima United – 2013
Fábio – Albirex Niigata – 2020
Fábio Aguiar – SC Sagamihara, Yokohama F. Marinos, Gamba Osaka – 2012–2018
Fábio Júnior – Kashima Antlers – 2004
Fábio Lopes – Cerezo Osaka – 2011
Fábio Nunes – Vegalta Sendai – 2004
Fábio Pena – Roasso Kumamoto – 2010–2014
Fábio Santos – Kashima Antlers – 2006
Fábio Santos – Tokushima Vortis – 2009
Fabio Simplicio – Cerezo Osaka, Vissel Kobe – 2012–2014
Fabrício – Kyoto Sanga – 2000
Fabrício – Jubilo Iwata – 2006–2007
Fabrício – Kashima Antlers, Urawa Red Diamonds – 2016, 2018–2021
Fagner – Montedio Yamagata, Albirex Niigata – 2009–2010
Fefo – Gainare Tottori – 2013
Felipe – Tochigi SC – 2015
Felipe – Vegalta Sendai, Fukushima United – 2007
Felipe Alves – Matsumoto Yamaga – 2013
Felipe Barros – Yokohama FC – 2014–2017
Felipe Félix – Consadole Sapporo, Kyoto Sanga, Giravanz Kitakyushu – 2013, 2015, 2018
Felipe Garcia – Nagoya Grampus – 2017–2018
Felipe Silva – Sanfrecce Hiroshima – 2017–2018
Felipe Tavares – FC Ryukyu – 2020–2021
Felipinho – FC Osaka, Tegevajaro Miyazaki – 2014–2017
Felippe Cardoso – Vegalta Sendai – 2021–2022
Fellipe Bertoldo – Oita Trinita, Verspah Oita – 2015
Fellype Gabriel – Kashima Antlers – 2010–2012
Ferdinando – Jubilo Iwata – 2014
Fernando – Kashima Antlers – 2003–2006
Fernando – Vissel Kobe – 2012
Fernando Henrique Mariano – Avispa Fukuoka – 1998–1999
Fernando Rech – Yokohama Flügels – 1997
Fernandinho – Gamba Osaka, Shimizu S-Pulse, Kyoto Sanga, Oita Trinita, Vegalta Sendai, Ventforet Kofu, Gainare Tottori – 2004–2012, 2014–2021
Ferreyra – Tokyo Verdy – 1992
Ferrugem – Vissel Kobe, Ventforet Kofu – 2015, 2018
Flávio Elias Cordeiro – Shonan Bellmare – 2006
Foguete – Kagoshima United, Ventforet Kofu – 2020–2022
Foguinho – Vegalta Sendai – 2021–
França – Kashiwa Reysol, Yokohama FC – 2005–2011
Francismar – Kawasaki Frontale, Tokyo Verdy – 2007–2008
Freire – Shimizu S-Pulse, Shonan Bellmare, V-Varen Nagasaki, FC Gifu – 2017–2022
Freitas – Ventforet Kofu – 2001
Fumagalli – Tokyo Verdy – 1998

G 
Gabriel – Vissel Kobe – 2006–2007
Gabriel França – Yokohama FC – 2021–
Gabriel Morbeck – Jubilo Iwata, SC Sagamihara – 2018
Gabriel Nascimento – Ventforet Kofu – 2022–
Gabriel Pimba – Ventforet Kofu – 2012
Gabriel Pires – FC Osaka – 2022
Gabriel Xavier – Nagoya Grampus, Consadole Sapporo – 2017–2022
Galeano – Gamba Osaka – 2003
Galvão – Sanfrecce Hiroshima, Ventforet Kofu – 2005, 2009
Garça – Nagoya Grampus – 1992–1994
Gavião – Jubilo Iwata – 2004
Geílson – Albirex Niigata – 2003
Genilson – Kawasaki Frontale – 1999
Geovani – SC Sagamihara – 2019–2020
Germano – Cerezo Osaka – 2007–2008
Gerson – Renofa Yamaguchi – 2018
Getúlio – Ventforet Kofu – 2022–
Gil – Tokyo Verdy – 2005
Gilmar – Tokyo Verdy, Yokohama FC – 2006, 2007, 2007
Gilmar Rinaldi – Cerezo Osaka – 1995–1997
Gilsinho – Jubilo Iwata, Ventforet Kofu, FC Gifu, Avispa Fukuoka – 2008–2011, 2013–2014, 2015, 2017
Gilton – Cerezo Osaka, Albirex Niigata, Kashima Antlers – 2008–2010
Giovani – Cerezo Osaka – 2007
Gláucio – Avispa Fukuoka – 2006–2007
Guga – Cerezo Osaka – 1996
Guilherme – Tonan Maebashi, SC Sagamihara, Esperanza SC – 2018–
Guilherme Almeida – Tokyo Verdy – 2014
Guilherme Santos – Júbilo Iwata – 2018
Gustavo – Montedio Yamagata – 2007
Gustavo – Nagoya Grampus, Roasso Kumamoto – 2014–2017
Gustavo Nescau – Albirex Niigata – 2023–

H 
Halef Pitbull – Mito HollyHock, ReinMeer Aomori – 2020, 2022
Harison – Urawa Red Diamonds, Vissel Kobe, Gamba Osaka – 2001–2003
Haruwiti Ikegami – FC Tokushima – 2022–
Heber Oliveira – FC Tokyo – 2006
Heberty – Thespakusatsu Gunma, Cerezo Osaka, Vegalta Sendai – 2012–2013
Henik – FC Gifu, Tochigi SC, Renofa Yamaguchi, Tochigi City – 2014–
Henrique – Tokyo Verdy – 1999
Henrique – Tokyo Verdy −1998
Henrique – Jubilo Iwata – 2007–2009
Henrique Trevisan – Oita Trinita, FC Tokyo – 2021–
Hugo Alcântara – Montedio Yamagata – 2011
Hugo – Ventforet Kofu, Roasso Kumamoto, Fagiano Okayama – 2013–2014
Hugo – Tokyo Verdy, Thespakusatsu Gunma – 2004, 2015
Hulk – Kawasaki Frontale, Consadole Sapporo, Tokyo Verdy – 2005–2008

I 
Igor Gabriel – Azul Claro Numazu – 2023–
Igor Sartori – Kashima Antlers, Ventforet Kofu – 2011, 2022
Itacaré – Consadole Sapporo – 2007
Iury – Renofa Yamaguchi – 2020
Izaias – Yokohama FC – 2006

J 
Jadílson – Consadole Sapporo – 2002
Jael – FC Tokyo, FC Tokyo U-23, Matsumoto Yamaga – 2019–2020
Jailton – Shonan Bellmare – 1999
Jaílton Paraíba – Tokyo Verdy – 2019
Jair – JEF United Chiba, Kashima Antlers – 2013–2014
Jairo – Kyoto Sanga – 2014
Japa – Cerezo Osaka, FC Osaka – 2006, 2013
Jean – FC Tokyo, Shonan Bellmare – 2002–2010
Jean Elias – Cerezo Osaka – 1997
Jean Moser – Zweigen Kanazawa, Tochigi SC – 2014, 2015
Jean Patric – Cerezo Osaka, Vissel Kobe – 2022–
Jean Patrick – Albirex Niigata – 2017
Jeci – Kawasaki Frontale – 2012–2014
Jeferson – Montedio Yamagata – 2000
Jefferson  – Roasso Kumamoto – 2013
Jefferson – Tokyo Verdy – 1999
Jefferson – Sagan Tosu, Yokohama FC, Fagiano Okayama – 2003–2007
Jefferson Baiano – Zweigen Kanazawa – 2023–
Jesiel – Kawasaki Frontale – 2019–
Jhonatan – Tochigi SC – 2015
Jô – Nagoya Grampus – 2018–2020
João Carlos – Cerezo Osaka – 2002–2003
João Gabriel – SC Sagamihara, Tochigi City FC, Kagoshima United – 2017–2021
João Paulo – Mito HollyHock – 2000
João Paulo – Albirex Niigata – 2010–2011
João Sales – Ventforet Kofu, Vegalta Sendai, Yokohama FC – 2008–2010
João Schmidt – Nagoya Grampus, Kawasaki Frontale – 2019–
João Siqueira – TIAMO Hirakata – 2022
João Victor – FC Osaka – 2023–
Jonathan Reis – Consadole Sapporo, Albirex Niigata – 2016–2018
Jonílson – Vegalta Sendai – 2007
Jorge Wagner – Kashiwa Reysol, Kashima Antlers – 2011–2014
Jorginho – Omiya Ardija, Ventforet Kofu – 2000–2003
Jorginho – Nagoya Grampus, Sanfrecce Hiroshima, Tokushima Vortis, FC Gifu – 2004–2007
Jorginho – Kashima Antlers – 1995–1998
Jorginho Putinatti – Nagoya Grampus – 1990–1994
José Reginaldo Vital – Gamba Osaka, Consadole Sapporo – 2000–2003
Josimar – Ventforet Kofu, Ehime FC, Tokyo Verdy – 2006–2012
Josue – Sagan Tosu, FC Machida Zelvia – 2007–2009
Julinho – Consadole Sapporo, Renofa Yamaguchi – 2016–2018
Júlio César – Tokyo Verdy – 1998
Julio César Pinheiro – Kyoto Sanga – 2006
Julio Rossi – Avispa Fukuoka – 1997
Junior – Kyoto Sanga – 1998
Junior Dutra – Kyoto Sanga, Kashima Antlers – 2010–2012
Júnior – Shonan Bellmare – 1995
Juan Alano – Kashima Antlers, Gamba Osaka – 2020–
Júnior Maranhão – Oita Trinita – 2007
Júnior Santos – Kashiwa Reysol, Yokohama F. Marinos, Sanfrecce Hiroshima – 2016–
Juninho – FC Osaka, Kyoto Sanga, Tochigi SC – 2015–
Juninho – Kawasaki Frontale, Kashima Antlers – 2003–2013
Juninho – Shimizu S-Pulse, Ventforet Kofu, Sagan Tosu, ReinMeer Aomori – 2002–2003, 2017–2018
Juninho Fonseca – Tokyo Verdy – 1991–1992
Junior – Sagan Tosu – 2003
Jussiê – Kashiwa Reysol – 2003
Jymmy França – Shimizu S-Pulse, Tokyo Verdy – 2012

K 
Kaio – Cerezo Osaka, Yokohama FC – 2008–2013
Kaique da Silva – Thespakusatsu Gunma – 2014–2015
Kaique Mafaldo – V-Varen Nagasaki – 2022–
Kaique Vergilio – Thespakusatsu Gunma – 2014–2015
Katatau – Yokohama FC – 2007
Kauã – Fujieda MYFC – 2022–
Kayke – Yokohama F. Marinos – 2016–2018
Kelly – FC Tokyo – 2001–2004
Kempes – Cerezo Osaka, JEF United Chiba – 2012–2014
Kerlon – Fujieda MYFC – 2012–2014
Kiros – Kyoto Sanga – 2016
Kléber – Yokohama FC – 2021–
Kleber Romero – Consadole Sapporo – 1999
Klebinho – Tokyo Verdy – 2019–2021
Kleiton Domingues – Tokushima Vortis, FC Gifu – 2014

L 
Lange – Cerezo Osaka, Gamba Osaka – 1987–1992
Lê – Ventforet Kofu – 2004
Leandro – Tokyo Verdy – 2008–2009
Leandro – Vegalta Sendai, Fukushima United – 2007
Leandro Damião – Kawasaki Frontale – 2019–
Leandro Domingues – Kashiwa Reysol, Nagoya Grampus, Yokohama FC – 2010–2015,2017–2020
Leandro Euzébio – Omiya Ardija – 2007–2008
Leandro Love – Vissel Kobe – 2006
Leandro Montera – Omiya Ardija, Montedio Yamagata, Vissel Kobe, Gamba Osaka, Tokyo Verdy – 2005–2008, 2012–2020
Leandro Moura – Kashima Antlers, FC Tokyo – 2017–
Leandro Oliveira – Thespakusatsu Gunma – 2015
Leandro Pereira – Matsumoto Yamaga, Sanfrecce Hiroshima, Gamba Osaka – 2019–2022
Leandro Rodrigues – Oita Trinita – 2001
Leandro Simioni – Yokohama F. Marinos – 2001
Leandro Vieira – Kyoto Sanga FC – 2004
Lenny – Ventforet Kofu – 2013
Léo – Yokohama F. Marinos – 2002
Léo Bahia – Zweigen Kanazawa – 2023–
Léo Ceará – FC Ryukyu, Yokohama F. Marinos – 2016, 2021–
Leo Kenta – Roasso Kumamoto – 2021–2022
Léo Mineiro – FC Gifu, Avispa Fukuoka, Fagiano Okayama, FC Imabari – 2015–2016, 2018–2021
Léo Rocha – FC Gifu – 2016
Léo San – Montedio Yamagata – 2004–2009
Léo Silva – Albirex Niigata, Kashima Antlers, Nagoya Grampus – 2013–2022
Leonardo – Kashima Antlers – 1994–1996
Leonardo – Gainare Tottori, Albirex Niigata, Urawa Red Diamonds – 2018–2020
Leonardo Kalil – Albirex Niigata – 2016
Leozinho – SC Sagamihara, Maruyasu Okazaki, Tochigi City, Esperanza SC, Wyvern FC – 2015–
Lincoln – Avispa Fukuoka, Shonan Bellmare, Thespakusatsu Gunma – 2007–2012
Lincoln – Vissel Kobe – 2021–
Lindomar – Albirex Niigata – 2001
Lins – Gamba Osaka, Ventforet Kofu, FC Tokyo – 2014–2018
Lipe Veloso – FC Tokyo, FC Tokyo U-23 – 2017–2018
Lobão – Cerezo Osaka – 2005–2007
Lopes Tigrão – Vegalta Sendai, Yokohama F. Marinos – 2006–2008
Luan – V-Varen Nagasaki – 2020–2021
Lucas Fernandes – Consadole Sapporo – 2019–
Lucas Rian – Matsumoto Yamaga – 2023–
Lucão – Shonan Bellmare – 2011
Lucão – Kagoshima United, Zweigen Kanazawa, Matsumoto Yamaga, Fagiano Okayama – 2019–
Lucas – FC Tokyo, Gamba Osaka – 2004–2013
Lucas – Gamba Osaka – 2006
Lucas – SC Sagamihara – 2016
Lucas Daubermann – Kataller Toyama, Kochi United SC, Toyama Shinjo – 2018–
Lucas Gaúcho – Thespakusatsu Gunma – 2016
Lucas Fernandes – Consadole Sapporo – 2019–
Lucas Mineiro – Cerezo Osaka – 2020
Lucas Morelatto – Iwate Grulla Morioka – 2020–2022
Luciano – Oita Trinita, Sagan Tosu – 2000–2001
Luis Alberto – Kashima Antlers – 2014
Luís Henrique – Kataller Toyama – 2022
Luís Müller – Gamba Osaka – 1992–1993
Luis Robson – Gamba Osaka, Consadole Sapporo – 1992–1993, 2002
Luiz – Shonan Bellmare – 1996
Luiz – Kawasaki Frontale – 2000–2001
Luiz Carlos – Kyoto Sanga – 1995–1997
Luiz Fernando – FC Osaka – 2021–
Luizão – Nagoya Grampus – 2005
Luizinho Vieira – Gamba Osaka – 1999
Luiz Phellype – FC Tokyo – 2022–
Lukian – Jubilo Iwata, Avispa Fukuoka – 2019–
Lulinha – Júbilo Iwata, Montedio Yamagata – 2020–2021

M 
Magno Alves – Oita Trinita, Gamba Osaka – 2004–2007
Magno Cruz – Cerezo Osaka – 2015
Magnum – Kawasaki Frontale, Nagoya Grampus – 2006–2010
Magrão – Tokyo Verdy, Gamba Osaka – 1996–1997
Maguinho – Kawasaki Frontale, Yokohama FC – 2019–2021
Magrão – Yokohama F. Marinos – 2005–2006
Maicon Souza – Montedio Yamagata – 2011
Maranhão – Ventforet Kofu, Tokyo Verdy – 2008, 2009–2012, 2015
Marcão – Shimizu S-Pulse – 1993
Marcão – Kashiwa Reysol – 1998
Marcão – Kawasaki Frontale – 2006
Marcel – Vissel Kobe – 2009
Marcel Sacramento – Albirex Niigata – 2005
Marcelinho Carioca – Gamba Osaka – 2002
Marcelo – Cerezo Osaka – 2001
Marcelo Casemiro – Veroskronos Tsuno – 2020–
Marcelo Labarthe – Ventforet Kofu – 2009
Marcelo Mabilia – Jubilo Iwata – 1997
Marcelo Mattos – FC Tokyo, Oita Trinita – 2002
Marcelo Miguel – Shimizu S-Pulse – 1995–1996
Marcelo Ramos – Nagoya Grampus, Sanfrecce Hiroshima – 2001–2003
Marcelo Ryan – Yokohama FC – 2022–
Marcelo Soares – Vegalta Sendai – 2009
Marcinho – Kawasaki Frontale – 2021–
Marcio Alves – Consadole Sapporo, FC Machida Zelvia – 2012–2013
Márcio Araújo – Kashiwa Reysol – 2007
Márcio Richardes – Albirex Niigata, Urawa Red Diamonds – 2009–2014
Marco – Shimizu S-Pulse – 1995
Marco Antonio – Shimizu S-Pulse – 1992–1993
Marco Brito – Yokohama F. Marinos – 2001
Marco Tulio – Albirex Niigata – 2000
Marcos Antônio – Kashiwa Reysol – 2006
Marcos Aurélio – Shimizu S-Pulse – 2008
Marcos Aurélio – Avispa Fukuoka, Kawasaki Frontale – 1998, 2002
Marcos Júnior – Yokohama F. Marinos – 2019–
Marcos Paulo – Yokohama FC, Shimizu S-Pulse – 2007–2009
Marcus – Albirex Niigata, Kawasaki Frontale, Tokyo Verdy, Yokohama F. Marinos – 2002–2007
Marcus Índio – FC Imabari – 2022–
Mário César – Yokohama F. Marinos – 1992
Marlon – Thespakusatsu Gunma – 2006–2007
Marlon – Kawasaki Frontale – 2002
Marquem – Vegalta Sendai – 2002–2003
Marques – Nagoya Grampus, Yokohama F. Marinos – 2003–2007
Marquinho – Montedio Yamagata, Albirex Niigata, Kawasaki Frontale, Mito HollyHock, Tonan Maebashi – 1997–1998, 2001–2002, 2004–2010
Marquinhos – Kyoto Sanga – 2003
Marquinhos – Cerezo Osaka – 1994–1996
Marquinhos – Tokyo Verdy, Yokohama F. Marinos, JEF United Chiba, Shimizu S-Pulse, Kashima Antlers, Vegalta Sendai, Vissel Kobe – 2001–2015
Marquinhos Paraná – Jubilo Iwata, Ventforet Kofu – 2007, 2013–2016
Martinez – Cerezo Osaka – 2009–2011
Mateus Moraes – Yokohama FC – 2022–
Matheus – Thespakusatsu Gunma – 2016–2017
Matheus Ferraz – FC Tokyo – 2014
Matheus Jesus – Gamba Osaka – 2018
Matheus Leiria – Kataller Toyama – 2021–
Matheus Sávio – Kashiwa Reysol – 2019–
Matheus Vidotto – Tokyo Verdy – 2020–
Maykon Douglas – FC Osaka – 2023–
Maurício – Kashiwa Reysol – 2000
Mauricio Antonio – Urawa Red Diamonds – 2017–2021
Mauricio Salles – Omiya Ardija – 2007
Mateus – Omiya Ardija, Nagoya Grampus – 2014–
Max Carrasco – Vegalta Sendai – 2011
Maxsandro – Consadole Sapporo – 2002
Mazinho – Vissel Kobe – 2013
Mazinho – Kashima Antlers, Kawasaki Frontale – 1995–2000
Mazola – Urawa Red Diamonds – 2011
Mendes – Zweigen Kanazawa, Tochigi SC, Ventforet Kofu, Kyoto Sanga – 2015–
Mert Nobre – Kashiwa Reysol – 2003
Michael – JEF United Chiba, Albirex Niigata – 2008–2012
Miguel Bianconi – Kamatamare Sanuki – 2016
Mikhael Akatsuka – Azul Claro Numazu – 2023–
Milton Cruz – Tokyo Verdy, Yokohama F. Marinos, Kashima Antlers – 1988–1992
Milton Júnior – SC Sagamihara – 2019–2020
Mineiro – Gamba Osaka – 2008
Mineiro – Kyoto Sanga – 1997
Mirandinha – Shimizu S-Pulse, Shonan Bellmare – 1992–1994
Moabe Platini – Oita Trinita, MIO Biwako Shiga – 2006–2007
Moacir – Tokyo Verdy – 1998
Moisés – Avispa Fukuoka – 2015
Müller – Kashiwa Reysol – 1995–1996
Muriqui – FC Tokyo – 2016

N 
Nádson – Vegalta Sendai – 2008
Naldinho – Nagoya Grampus – 2022–
Nasa – Yokohama F. Marinos – 2001–2002
Nasa – Kyoto Sanga, Albirex Niigata – 1999–2000
Nathan Ribeiro – Kashiwa Reysol – 2018
Nelsinho – Kashiwa Reysol – 1993–1995
Neto – Albirex Niigata – 2005
Neto Baiano – JEF United Chiba, Kashiwa Reysol – 2009–2010, 2012
Neto Volpi – Shimizu S-Pulse – 2020
Nildo – Tokyo Verdy, Consadole Sapporo, Fukushima United, Kagoshima United, Suzuka Point Getters – 2014–2015, 2017–2021
Nilson – Ventforet Kofu – 2016
Nilson – Sagan Tosu – 2013
Nilton – Vissel Kobe – 2016–2017
Nivaldo – Montedio Yamagata, Shonan Bellmare – 2003, 2006

O 
Obina – Matsumoto Yamaga – 2015–2016
Oscar – Yokohama F. Marinos – 1987–1989
Oséas – Vissel Kobe, Albirex Niigata – 2002–2004
Osmar – Oita Trinita – 2006
Osmar Francisco – Avispa Fukuoka, Ehime FC, Mito HollyHock – 2012–2014

P 
Pablo – FC Ryukyu, Kataller Toyama – 2016–2017
Pablo – Cerezo Osaka – 2015
Pablo Diogo – Vegalta Sendai – 2016–2017
Pará – Vegalta Sendai – 2020
Patric – Kawasaki Frontale, Ventforet Kofu, Gamba Osaka, Gamba Osaka U-23, Sanfrecce Hiroshima, Kyoto Sanga – 2013–
Patrick Vieira – Yokohama FC – 2013
Paulão – Consadole Sapporo, Fukushima United, Mito HollyHock, Albirex Niigata, FC Gifu – 2013–2021
Paulinho – Ventforet Kofu, Gamba Osaka, Oita Trinita – 2010–2013, 2015–2016
Paulinho – Nagoya Grampus – 1991–1992
Paulinho McLaren – Shonan Bellmare – 1996
Paulinho – Tokyo Verdy – 1992–1993
Paulinho – Tochigi SC, Kawasaki Frontale, JEF United Chiba, Shonan Bellmare, Matsumoto Yamaga, Fagiano Okayama – 2010–
Paulinho Bóia – Kyoto Sanga – 2022–
Paulo Baya – Ventforet Kofu – 2021
Paulo Henrique – JEF United Chiba, Vegalta Sendai – 1999
Paulo Jamelli – Kashiwa Reysol, Shimizu S-Pulse – 1997, 2004
Paulo Magino – Kyoto Sanga – 1999
Paulo Rodrigues Barc – Tokyo Verdy – 1993–1994
Pedrinho – Kawasaki Frontale – 2000
Pedro Henrique – Fujieda MYFC – 2022–
Pedro Júnior – Omiya Ardija, Albirex Niigata, Gamba Osaka, FC Tokyo, Vissel Kobe, Kashima Antlers – 2007–2011, 2014–2018
Pedro Perotti – FC Tokyo – 2023–
Pedro Raúl – Kashiwa Reysol – 2021
Pereira – Tokyo Verdy, Consadole Sapporo – 1992–1998
Pereira – Oita Trinita – 2021–
Perez – Mito HollyHock – 2000
Pericles – Gamba Osaka, Cerezo Osaka, Sagan Tosu, Gainare Tottori – 1991–1995, 1998–2000, 2003–2004
Phelipe Megiolaro – Vissel Kobe – 2023–
Pingo – Cerezo Osaka – 2006
Pintado – Cerezo Osaka – 1998
Pita – Shonan Bellmare, Nagoya Grampus – 1991–1993
Popó – Kashiwa Reysol, Urawa Red Diamonds, Vissel Kobe – 2008–2012

R 
Rafael – Oita Trinita – 2006
Rafael Bastos – Consadole Sapporo – 2009
Rafael Marques – Omiya Ardija, Ventforet Kofu – 2009–2010, 2020–2021
Rafael Ratão – Albirex Niigata – 2015
Rafael Scheidt – Kawasaki Frontale – 1997
Rafael Silva – Albirex Niigata, Urawa Red Diamonds – 2014–2017
Rafaelson – Vegalta Sendai – 2018
Rafinha – Avispa Fukuoka, Thespakusatsu Gunma, Gamba Osaka, Yokohama F. Marinos – 2007, 2010–2012, 2014–2016
Ramazotti – Avispa Fukuoka, Gainare Tottori – 2011, 2014
Ramon Lopes – Vegalta Sendai, Kashiwa Reysol – 2014–2020
Ramon – Tokyo Verdy – 2003
Ramon – FC Ryukyu, Gainare Tottori – 2019–2021
Ramón – Consadole Sapporo – 2012
Ranieli – Avispa Fukuoka – 1999
Raphael Macena – Shonan Bellmare – 2012
Raudnei – Kyoto Sanga – 1996
Raul Sudati – Azul Claro Numazu – 2023–
Reginaldo – JEF United Chiba – 2012
Regis Felisberto Masarim – Kashima Antlers – 1992–1993
Regis Pitbull – Kyoto Sanga – 2000
Régis Silva – Nagoya Grampus – 2014
Renan – Consadole Sapporo, Fukushima United – 2014, 2017
Renan Mota – Kyoto Sanga – 2019–2020
Reinaldo – Kashiwa Reysol, JEF United Chiba – 2005, 2007–2008
Reinaldo Alagoano – Vegalta Sendai – 2010
Reinaldo Vicente Simão – Shonan Bellmare – 1995–1997
Renan – Renofa Yamaguchi – 2018–
Renato – Ventforet Kofu – 2022
Renato Augusto – Shimizu S-Pulse – 2019–
Renatinho – Kawasaki Frontale – 2008–2010
Renatinho – Kawasaki Frontale – 2012–2015
Renato – Yokohama F. Marinos, Kashiwa Reysol – 1989–1993
Renato – Ventforet Kofu – 2012
Renato Cajá – Kashima Antlers – 2012
René Santos – Kawasaki Frontale – 2012
Rhayner – Kawasaki Frontale, Sanfrecce Hiroshima, Yokohama FC – 2017, 2019–
Ricardinho – Kashiwa Reysol – 2002
Ricardinho – Consadole Sapporo – 1999
Ricardinho – Kashiwa Reysol, Kashima Antlers – 2002–2006
Ricardinho – FC Tokyo – 2010
Rick – Tokyo Verdy – 2006
Ricardo – Kashima Antlers, Vegalta Sendai, Sanfrecce Hiroshima, Kyoto Sanga – 1998–2006
Ricardo Graça – Júbilo Iwata – 2022–
Ricardo Lobo – Tochigi SC, Kashiwa Reysol, JEF United Chiba – 2010–2012, 2016
Ricardo Lopes – JEF United Chiba – 2022
Ricardo Santos – Cerezo Osaka, Cerezo Osaka U-23, Fagiano Okayama – 2016–2018
Ricardo Souza Silva – Nagoya Grampus, Shonan Bellmare, Kawasaki Frontale – 1997–2001
Rick – Tokyo Verdy – 2006
Richardson – Kashiwa Reysol – 2019–2021
Rinaldo – Gamba Osaka – 2009
Riuler – Veroskronos Tsuno, Shonan Bellmare, FC Osaka – 2019–2021
Robert – Consadole Sapporo – 2003
Robert – Kawasaki Frontale – 2003
Robert – Kashiwa Reysol – 2003
Roberto – FC Tokyo – 2011–2013
Roberto – Avispa Fukuoka, Oita Trinita, Sagan Tosu, Yokohama FC, FC Tokyo – 2004–2012
Roberval Davino – IEC FC – 1992
Róbson – Oita Trinita – 2003
Robson – Kawasaki Frontale – 2013
Robson Ponte – Urawa Red Diamonds – 2005–2010
Rodrigo – Jubilo Iwata – 2008–2010
Rodrigo Angelotti – Kashiwa Reysol, Omiya Ardija – 2021–
Rodrigo Batata – Yokohama Flügels – 1995	
Rodrigo Cabeça – Matsumoto Yamaga, Kataller Toyama, Nankatsu SC, Esperanza SC – 2013, 2017–2021
Rodrigo Gral – Jubilo Iwata, Yokohama F. Marinos, Omiya Ardija – 2002–2006
Rodrigo Mancha – Oita Trinita – 2013
Rodrigo Maranhão – Zweigen Kanazawa – 2018
Rodrigo Mendes – Kashima Antlers, Oita Trinita – 1996–1997, 2003
Rodrigo Pimpão – Cerezo Osaka, Omiya Ardija – 2011
Rodrigo Souto – Jubilo Iwata – 2011–2012
Rodrigo Tiuí – Fukushima United – 2015–2017
Rodolfo – Montedio Yamagata, Zweigen Kanazawa – 2019–2021
Roger – Kashiwa Reysol – 2010–2011
Roger Machado – Vissel Kobe – 2004–2005
Roger Gaúcho – Albirex Niigata – 2014–2015
Rogerinho – Vissel Kobe – 2011
Rogério Corrêa – Shimizu S-Pulse – 2005
Romarinho – Zweigen Kanazawa – 2016
Romildo – Nagoya Grampus – 2000
Rômulo – SC Sagamihara – 2020–2021
Ronaldão – Shimizu S-Pulse – 1994–1995
Ronaldo – Shimizu S-Pulse – 2021–
Ronaldo Henrique Silva – Yokohama FC – 2014
Rôni – Yokohama F. Marinos, Gamba Osaka – 2008
Roni – Sagan Tosu – 2013
Rony – Albirex Niigata – 2017–2018
Ruan – FC Ryukyu – 2006
Rudnei – Ventforet Kofu – 2011

S 
Sabia – Tochigi SC, Matsumoto Yamaga, FC Machida Zelvia – 2011–2015
Saldanha – JEF United Chiba – 2021–
Samir – Avispa Fukuoka – 2012
Samuel Alves – SC Sagamihara, FC Maruyasu Okazaki – 2017–2020
Samuel – Sagan Tosu – 2009
Samuel – Oita Trinita – 2022–
Sandro – JEF United Chiba – 2003–2004
Sandro – JEF United Chiba, Honda FC, FC Tokyo, Oita Trinita – 1992–2004
Sandro – Renofa Yamaguchi – 2020–
Santos – Shonan Bellmare – 2003
Saulo – Albirex Niigata – 1999
Saulo Mineiro – Yokohama FC – 2021–
Schwenck – Vegalta Sendai – 2005
Sérgio – Albirex Niigata, Avispa Fukuoka – 1999–2003
Sérgio Manoel – Cerezo Osaka – 1996–1997
Sérgio Soares – Kyoto Sanga – 1996
Sergino – Matsumoto Yamaga – 2017–2020
Serginho – Kashima Antlers – 2018–2020
Serginho Baiano – Oita Trinita – 2007
Sidiclei – Gamba Osaka, Montedio Yamagata, Kyoto Sanga, Oita Trinita, Vissel Kobe – 1990–2009
Sidmar – Shimizu S-Pulse, Fujieda MYFC – 1993–1995, 2017
Silas Pereira – Kyoto Sanga – 1998–1999
Silva – Shonan Bellmare – 2002
Silvinho – Vegalta Sendai, Albirex Niigata, Yokohama FC – 2002–2007, 2010
Silvinho – Albirex Niigata – 2019–2020
Souza – Cerezo Osaka – 2016–2020

T 
Taílson – Gamba Osaka – 1999
Talles Cunha – SC Sagamihara – 2015
Tartá – Kashima Antlers – 2011
Tatico – Okinawa Kariyushi FC, FC Ryukyu, Giravanz Kitakyushu, Unsommet Iwate Hachimantai, Tonan Maebashi, ReinMeer Aomori, FC Osaka – 2003–2004, 2007–2013
Thales Paula – Nagoya Grampus, Roasso Kumamoto – 2021–
Thalles – Albirex Niigata – 2018
Thiago – Matsumoto Yamaga – 2012
Thiago Galhardo – Albirex Niigata – 2017
Thiago Martinelli – Cerezo Osaka – 2009
Thiago Martins – Yokohama F Marinos – 2018–2021
Thiago Neves – Vegalta Sendai – 2006
Thiago Quirino – Consadole Sapporo, Ventforet Kofu, Shonan Bellmare, Oita Trinita, Kagoshima United – 2009–2016, 2018
Thiago Santana – Shimizu S-Pulse – 2021–
Thiago Silva – Matsumoto Yamaga – 2012
Thuler – Vissel Kobe – 2022–
Tiago Alves – Shimizu S-Pulse, Sagan Tosu, Gamba Osaka, Fagiano Okayama – 2017, 2019–
Tiago – Nagoya Grampus, FC Gifu – 2013–2014
Tiago – Sanfrecce Hiroshima, Fagiano Okayama – 2004, 2011–2012
Tiago Leonço – JEF United Chiba – 2022
Tiago Pagnussat – Nagoya Grampus, Cerezo Osaka – 2021–2022
Tico – Montedio Yamagata – 2005
Thiego – Kyoto Sanga – 2010
Tinga – Jubilo Iwata – 2014
Tinga – Kawasaki Frontale – 1999
Tiquinho – SC Sagamihara – 2018
Toninho – Tokyo Verdy, Consadole Sapporo, Urawa Red Diamonds – 1991–1996
Toninho – Omiya Ardija – 2001–2006
Toninho Cecílio – Cerezo Osaka – 1994–1995
Toró – SC Sagamihara – 2014–2016, 2018
Tozin – Sagan Tosu – 2009, 2012
Túlio – Oita Trinita – 2005–2006

U 
Ueslei – Sanfrecce Hiroshima, Oita Trinita – 2006–2009

V 
Vagner – Ventforet Kofu – 2001
Válber – Yokohama Flügels, Yokohama F. Marinos – 1994, 1997, 1999
Valci Júnior – Gainare Tottori – 2016
Valdir Benedito – Kashiwa Reysol – 1995–1997
Valdo – Shimizu S-Pulse – 2020–
Valdo Filho – Nagoya Grampus – 1997–1998
Valdney – Kawasaki Frontale, Oita Trinita – 1998, 2000
Vinicius – Vegalta Sendai – 2017
Vinícius Araújo – Montedio Yamagata, Machida Zelvia – 2020–2022
Vinícius Faria – FC Ryukyu, Suzuka Point Getters – 2022–
Vinícius Gobetti – Veertien Mie, Fukui United, Wyvern FC – 2015–
Vitor Gabriel – Gainare Tottori – 2018–2019

W 
Wagner – Shonan Bellmare, Tokushima Vortis, Kashiwa Reysol – 1992–1996
Wágner – Cerezo Osaka – 2001
Walmerson – Tokyo Verdy – 2019
Walter – Jubilo Iwata, Honda FC, Consadole Sapporo, Montedio Yamagata – 1993–1999
Wanderson – Iwate Grulla Morioka – 2020
Washington – Nagoya Grampus, Renofa Yamaguchi – 2017–2018
Washington – Tokyo Verdy, Urawa Red Diamonds – 2005–2007
Washington – Montedio Yamagata – 2000
Washington – FC Tokyo – 2006
Washington – Cerezo Osaka – 2001
Weberton – Ventforet Kofu – 2009
Wellington – Avispa Fukuoka, Vissel Kobe – 2015–2019
Wellington – Shonan Bellmare, Avispa Fukuoka – 2021–
Wellington Katzor – Avispa Fukuoka, Giravanz Kitakyushu – 2009–2010
Wellington Rato – V-Varen Nagasaki – 2021
Wellington Silva – Tokushima Vortis – 2008
Wellington Silva – Gamba Osaka – 2021–2022
Wescley – Vissel Kobe – 2017–2019
Weslley – SC Sagamihara, Tokyo Verdy, Iwaki FC, Kagoshima United – 2013–2016, 2019–
Weslley – Shonan Bellmare – 2016
Will – Consadole Sapporo, Yokohama F. Marinos, Oita Trinita – 2001–2003
William – Kyoto Sanga, SP Kyoto FC – 2008–2009
William Alves – Fujieda MYFC – 2007
William Henrique – Ventforet Kofu – 2015
William Matheus – Shimizu S-Pulse – 2021–
William Pottker – Ventforet Kofu – 2013
Willian Lira – Ventforet Kofu – 2021–2022
Willian Popp – Avispa Fukuoka – 2017
Willian Rocha – Nagoya Grampus – 2018
Willian Xavier – Vegalta Sendai – 2007
Willians Santana – Matsumoto Yamaga – 2015–2016
Wilson – Vegalta Sendai, Ventforet Kofu – 2012–2017
Wolnei Caio – Kashiwa Reysol – 1995

Y 
Yago Pikachu – Shimizu S-Pulse – 2022–
Yan Mateus – Yokohama F. Marinos – 2022–
Yuri – Gainare Tottori – 2019
Yuri – Tochigi SC – 2019
Yuri Mamute – SC Sagamihara – 2020–2021
Yuri Messias – Tiamo Hirakata – 2022

Z 
Zé Carlos – Gamba Osaka – 2010
Zé Carlos – Cerezo Osaka – 2005–2007
Zé Luís – Tokyo Verdy – 2006–2007
Zé Roberto – Kashiwa Reysol – 2004
Zé Sérgio – Kashiwa Reysol – 1989–1991
Zico – Kashima Antlers – 1991–1994
Zinho – Yokohama Flügels – 1995–1997

Bulgaria 
Hristo Stoichkov – Kashiwa Reysol – 1998–1999
Ilian Stoyanov – JEF United Chiba, Sanfrecce Hiroshima, Fagiano Okayama – 2005–2011
Kiril Metkov – Gamba Osaka – 1993–1994
Neško Milovanović – Sanfrecce Hiroshima – 2002

Burkina Faso 
Bertrand Mac Gildas Oubida – FC Ryukyu – 2015
Dieudonné Minoungou – FC Ryukyu – 2008
Wilfried Sanou – Urawa Red Diamonds, Kyoto Sanga FC – 2010, 2012–2013

Cambodia 
Chan Vathanaka – Fujieda MYFC – 2017

Cameroon 
Achille Emaná – Tokushima Vortis – 2016
Cyrille Ndongo-Keller – Yokohama Flügels – 1997
Edwin Ifeanyi – FC Tokyo, Tokyo Verdy, Omiya Ardija, Oita Trinita, Montedio Yamagata – 1995–2000
John Mary – Avispa Fukuoka – 2021–2022
Michel Pensée – Sanfrecce Hiroshima – 2002
Noah Devena Fortune – TIAMO Hirakata – 2022–
Olivier Boumal – Yokohama F. Marinos – 2018
Patrick M'Boma – Gamba Osaka, Tokyo Verdy, Vissel Kobe – 1997–2005
Stephen Tataw – Sagan Tosu – 1995–1996

Canada 
Dejan Jaković – Shimizu S-Pulse – 2014–2016
Issey Nakajima-Farran – Albirex Niigata – 2003
Matt Lam – JEF United Chiba – 2011
Paris Nakajima-Farran – Dezzolla Shimane, Tokyo 23 FC – 2013–2014

Chile 
Byron Vásquez – Iwaki FC, Tokyo Verdy – 2019–
Francisco Fernández – Mito Hollyhock – 2003
Frank Lobos – Mito Hollyhock – 2003

China 
Chen Binbin – Kataller Toyama – 2022
Chen Yunhua – Iwate Grulla Morioka – 2018
Gao Sheng – Kawasaki Frontale – 1991–1995
Gao Tianyu – Iwate Grulla Morioka – 2019–2020
Gao Zhunyi – Kataller Toyama, Avispa Fukuoka – 2014–2015
Jia Xiuquan – Gamba Osaka – 1992–1993
Ju Feng – Ehime FC – 2017
Lü Hongxiang – Kawasaki Frontale, FC Tokyo – 1987–1991
Lü Xuean – Shonan Bellmare, Iwate Grulla Morioka – 2018
Ma Lin – NKK SC – 1992
Ma Shuai – Unsommet Iwate Hachimantai – 2010–2011
Shen Xiangfu – Kawasaki Frontale – 1988–1991
Sun Jungang – Giravanz Kitakyushu – 2017
Tang Yaodong – Tokushima Vortis – 1992
Wang Baoshan – Tokushima Vortis – 1991–1993
Wang Jianan – Sagan Tosu – 2020
Wang Jingbin – Fagiano Okayama – 2016
Wu Shaocong – Shimizu S-Pulse, Kyoto Sanga – 2018–2019
Xu Xiaofei – Consadole Sapporo, Kamatamare Sanuki, Gainare Tottori, Mitsubishi Mizushima, Minami Club – 2005–2008, 2012
Yang Fan – Iwate Grulla Morioka – 2017
Zhao Dayu – Urawa Red Diamonds – 1988–1990
Zhao Tianci – YSCC Yokohama – 2018–2019

Chinese Taipei 
Lu Kun-chi – Iwate Grulla Morioka – 2007

Colombia 
Arley Dinas – Shonan Bellmare – 2001
Cristian Nazarit – FC Gifu, Consadole Sapporo – 2014–2015
Danilson Córdoba – Consadole Sapporo, Nagoya Grampus, Avispa Fukuoka – 2009–2017
Ever Palacios – Shonan Bellmare, Kashiwa Reysol – 2001–2004
Fabián González Lasso – Jubilo Iwata – 2021–
Félix Micolta – Avispa Fukuoka – 2019
Hámilton Ricard – Shonan Bellmare – 2003
Hernán Gaviria – Shonan Bellmare – 2001
James Angulo – Shonan Bellmare – 2001
Julián Estiven Vélez – Vissel Kobe, Tokushima Vortis – 2013–2015
Jonathan Restrepo – Sagan Tosu, Oita Trinita – 2013–2014
Nixon Perea – Vegalta Sendai – 1999
Victor Ibarbo – Sagan Tosu, V-Varen Nagasaki – 2017–

Croatia 
Alen Stanešić – Cerezo Osaka – 2003 
Andrej Panadić – Nagoya Grampus – 2002–2004
Branko Hucika – Shonan Bellmare – 2000
Dario Dabac – Sanfrecce Hiroshima – 2006–2008
Goran Jurić – Yokohama F. Marinos – 2000
Goran Rubil – Shonan Bellmare – 2005
Igor Cvitanović – Shimizu S-Pulse – 2002
Igor Jovićević – Yokohama F. Marinos – 1999
Josip Barišić – Shonan Bellmare – 2005
Karlo Bručić – Sagan Tosu – 2019
Krunoslav Lovrek – Cerezo Osaka – 2004
Mario Garba – Cerezo Osaka – 2004
Matej Jonjic – Cerezo Osaka – 2017–
Mato Neretljak – Omiya Ardija – 2009–2010
Mihael Mikić – Sanfrecce Hiroshima, Shonan Bellmare – 2009–2017
Mladen Mladenović – Gamba Osaka – 1996–1997
Nino Bule – Gamba Osaka – 2000–2001
Nino Galović – Sagan Tosu – 2019
Stipe Plazibat – FC Gifu, V-Varen Nagasaki – 2013–2014, 2014–2015
Stjepan Jukić – Sanfrecce Hiroshima – 2008
Tomislav Erceg – Sanfrecce Hiroshima – 2002–2003
Tomislav Marić – Urawa Red Diamonds – 2005
Vjekoslav Škrinjar – Gamba Osaka – 1995–1996
Vjeran Simunić – Yomiuri Soccer Club – 1983–1985

Costa Rica 
Danny Carvajal – Tokushima Vortis, Mito HollyHock, FC Ryukyu – 2018–
Giovanni Clunie – Zweigen Kanazawa – 2019
Kenny Cunningham – Gainare Tottori – 2012
Paulo Wanchope – FC Tokyo – 2007
Roy Smith – Gainare Tottori – 2012

Curaçao 
Quenten Martinus – Yokohama F. Marinos, Urawa Red Diamonds, Vegalta Sendai, Montedio Yamagata, Kyoto Sanga – 2016–

Cyprus 
Pieros Sotiriou – Sanfrecce Hiroshima – 2022–

Czech Republic  
František Mysliveček – JEF United Chiba, Ventforet Kofu, Vegalta Sendai – 1992–1996
Ivan Hašek – Sanfrecce Hiroshima, JEF United Chiba – 1994–1996
Ivo Ulich – Vissel Kobe – 2005
Július Bielik – Sanfrecce Hiroshima – 1991–1992
Martin Hřídel – JEF United Chiba – 1992
Martin Müller – Vissel Kobe – 2005
Pavel Černý – Sanfrecce Hiroshima – 1992–1994
Pavel Horváth – Vissel Kobe – 2004–2006
Pavel Řehák – JEF United Chiba, Consadole Sapporo, Yokohama FC – 1991–1994, 1995–1996, 1999

Democratic Republic of the Congo 
Ignace Moleka – Albirex Niigata – 1997–1998

Denmark 
Alexander Scholz – Urawa Red Diamonds – 2021–
Brian Steen Nielsen – Urawa Red Diamonds – 1996
Kasper Junker – Urawa Red Diamonds, Nagoya Grampus – 2021–
Michael Laudrup – Vissel Kobe – 1996–1997

Dominican Republic 
Luismi Quezada – Tokushima Vortis – 2023–

Egypt 
Osama Elsamni – Tokyo Verdy, Montedio Yamagata, YSCC Yokohama – 2007–2008, 2011–2016

El Salvador 
Jaime Rodriguez – Yokohama Flügels – 1992–1993

England 
David Hodgson – Sanfrecce Hiroshima – 1989–1990
Don Goodman – Sanfrecce Hiroshima – 1998–1999
Gary Lineker – Nagoya Grampus Eight – 1992–1994
Jay Bothroyd – Júbilo Iwata, Consadole Sapporo – 2015–2021
Ian Crook – Sanfrecce Hiroshima – 1997–1998
Ian Griffiths – Sanfrecce Hiroshima – 1988–1990
Mark Burke – Omiya Ardija – 1999–2000
Russell Milton – Kashiwa Reysol – 1989
Ryan Burge – Machida Zelvia – 2009
Stuart Thurgood – Shimizu S-Pulse – 2000
Tony Henry – Sanfrecce Hiroshima – 1989–1991

France 
Andrea Blede – JEF Reserves, Kamatamare Sanuki – 2011–2015
Basile Boli – Urawa Red Diamonds – 1996–1997
Franck Durix – Nagoya Grampus – 1995–1996
Gérald Passi – Nagoya Grampus – 1995
Kévin Le Bras – Shibuya City – 2021–

French Guiana 
Claude Dambury – Gamba Osaka – 1998–2001

Gabon 
Frédéric Bulot – FC Gifu – 2019

Georgia 
David Mujiri – Sanfrecce Hiroshima – 2011

Germany 
Cacau – Cerezo Osaka – 2014–2015
Dirk Lehmann – Yokohama FC – 2003
Dirk van der Ven – Yokohama FC – 2003
Guido Buchwald – Urawa Red Diamonds – 1994–1997
Frank Ordenewitz – JEF United Chiba, Vegalta Sendai – 1993–1994, 1996
Jan-Ole Sievers – FC Gifu – 2019
Leonard Brodersen – Mito HollyHock – 2022
Lukas Podolski – Vissel Kobe – 2017–2020
Mario Engels – Tokyo Verdy – 2023–
Michael Rummenigge – Urawa Red Diamonds – 1993–1995
Pierre Littbarski – JEF United Chiba, Vegalta Sendai – 1993–1994, 1996–1997
Reinhard Stumpf – Vegalta Sendai – 1996
Svend Brodersen – Yokohama FC – 2021–
Uwe Bein – Urawa Red Diamonds – 1994–1997
Uwe Rahn – Urawa Red Diamonds – 1993–1994

Ghana 
Abdul Naza Alhassan – Shonan Bellmare – 2008
Charles Dzisah – Nagoya Grampus – 2008–2009
Emmanuel Oti Essigba – Vegalta Sendai – 2021
James Bissue – Ococias Kyoto – 2022–
Kim Grant – Shonan Bellmare – 2005
Maxwell Ansah – Ococias Kyoto – 2021–
Michael Tawiah – Vonds Ichihara – 2017
Mohammed Faisal – Urawa Red Diamonds – 2010
Owusu Benson – JEF United Chiba – 2000
Sadam Sulley – FC Ryukyu – 2022–
Yakubu Nassam Ibrahim – Ococias Kyoto – 2019–

Greece 
Avraam Papadopoulos – Jubilo Iwata – 2016–2017
Billy Konstantinidis – Ventforet Kofu – 2017

Guam 
John Matkin – Iwate Grulla Morioka – 2011–2013

Guinea 
José Kanté – Urawa Red Diamonds – 2023–

Guinea-Bissau 
Isma – Matsumoto Yamaga – 2019–2020 
Valdu Té – FC Imabari – 2021–2022
Vladimir Soares Forbs – FC Osaka – 2013

Honduras 
Saúl Martínez – Omiya Ardija – 2006

Hong Kong 
Au Yeung Yiu Chung – YSCC Yokohama, Iwate Grulla Morioka – 2021–
To Chun Kiu – Suzuka Point Getters – 2023–

India 
Arata Izumi – Mitsubishi Mizushima – 2006

Indonesia 
Irfan Bachdim – Ventforet Kofu, Consadole Sapporo – 2014–2016
Pratama Arhan – Tokyo Verdy – 2022–
Ricky Yacobi – Gamba Osaka – 1988
Ryu Nugraha – Nagano Parceiro, Fukui United FC – 2019–
Stefano Lilipaly – Consadole Sapporo – 2013

Israel 
Neta Lavi – Gamba Osaka – 2023–

Italy 
Cristian Battocchio – Tokushima Vortis – 2021
Daniele Massaro – Shimizu S-Pulse – 1995–1996
Desmond N'Ze – Fujieda MYFC, FC Gifu – 2012–2014
Giuseppe Zappella – Urawa Red Diamonds – 1998–1999
Michele Canini – FC Tokyo – 2014–2015
Salvatore Schillaci – Jubilo Iwata – 1994–1997

Ivory Coast 
Bernard Allou – Nagoya Grampus – 1998
Donald-Olivier Sié – Nagoya Grampus – 1996
Hamed Koné – Gainare Tottori – 2008–2011
Seydou Doumbia – Kashiwa Reysol, Tokushima Vortis – 2006–2008

Kenya 
Ayub Masika – Vissel Kobe – 2021
Ismael Dunga – Sagan Tosu, Kamatamare Sanuki – 2021–2022
Michael Olunga – Kashiwa Reysol – 2018–2020
Teddy Akumu – Sagan Tosu – 2023–

Kosovo 
Benjamin Kololli – Shimizu S-Pulse – 2021–
Besart Berisha – Sanfrecce Hiroshima – 2018–2019

Latvia 
Kristaps Zommers – Nara Club – 2020
Vitalijs Maksimenko – Omiya Ardija – 2020

Lebanon 
Joan Oumari – Sagan Tosu, Vissel Kobe, FC Tokyo – 2018–2022

Liberia 
Lamie Kiawu – Tokyo Verdy – 2000–2001

Luxembourg 
Gerson Rodrigues – Jubilo Iwata – 2019
Loris Tinelli – YSCC Yokohama – 2022–

Malawi 
Jabulani Linje – YSCC Yokohama, Shibuya City – 2018–2019, 2021–

Malaysia 
Hadi Fayyadh – Fagiano Okayama, Azul Claro Numazu – 2019–2022
Nazirul Naim Che Hashim – FC Ryukyu – 2013
Wan Zack Haikal – FC Ryukyu – 2013–2014
Tam Sheang Tsung – Avispa Fukuoka, Kataller Toyama, Gainare Tottori – 2013–2015

Mexico 
Félix Cruz – Yokohama F. Marinos – 1983–1984

Moldova 
Alexei Koșelev – Júbilo Iwata – 2021–2022

Montenegro 
Anto Drobnjak – Gamba Osaka – 1998–1999
Boris Tatar – FC Machida Zelvia – 2017
Budimir Vujačić – Vissel Kobe – 1997–1998
Dženan Radončić – Ventforet Kofu, Shimizu S-Pulse, Omiya Ardija, Oita Trinita – 2007, 2013–2014
Igor Burzanović – Nagoya Grampus – 2009–2011 
Miodrag Božović – Avispa Fukuoka – 1998
Nenad Maslovar – JEF United Chiba, Avispa Fukuoka – 1994–1999 
Stefan Mugoša − Vissel Kobe − 2022−
Željko Petrović – Urawa Red Diamonds – 1997–2000

Morocco 
Abdeljalil Hadda – Yokohama F. Marinos – 2000
Moestafa El Kabir – Sagan Tosu – 2016
Tarik Oulida – Nagoya Grampus, Consadole Sapporo – 1998–2002, 2003

Mozambique 
Simão Mate Junior – Vegalta Sendai – 2019–2021

Netherlands 
Alex Schalk - Urawa Red Diamonds - 2022–
Alfred Nijhuis – Urawa Red Diamonds – 1997–1998
André Paus – Jubilo Iwata, Kawasaki Frontale – 1994–1996
Arno van Zwam – Jubilo Iwata – 2000–2003
Bryan Linssen − Urawa Red Diamonds − 2022−
Calvin Jong-a-Pin – Shimizu S-Pulse, FC Machida Zelvia, Yokohama FC – 2011–2021
Erik van Rossum – Tokyo Verdy, Albirex Niigata – 1993, 1995
Gène Hanssen – Tokyo Verdy – 1993
Gerald Vanenburg – Jubilo Iwata – 1993–1996
Hans Gillhaus – Gamba Osaka – 1995–1996
Henny Meijer – Tokyo Verdy – 1993
Jan Veenhof – Omiya Ardija – 1998–2000
Jay-Roy Grot – Kashiwa Reysol – 2023–
John van Loen – Sanfrecce Hiroshima – 1995
Jordy Buijs – V-Varen Nagasaki, Tokushima Vortis, Kyoto Sanga, Fagiano Okayama – 2018–
Lorenzo Ebecilio – Jubilo Iwata – 2019–2020
Patrick Zwaanswijk – Oita Trinita – 2004–2005
Pieter Huistra – Sanfrecce Hiroshima – 1995–1996
Ralf Seuntjens – FC Imabari – 2022–
Regillio Simons – Kyoto Sanga – 2003
Richard Witschge – Oita Trinita – 2004
Ron Jans – Sanfrecce Hiroshima – 1987–1988
Sander van Gessel – JEF United Chiba – 2011
Tarik Oulida – Nagoya Grampus, Consadole Sapporo – 1998–2003
Thomas Bakker – Veertien Mie – 2017–2018

New Zealand 
Kayne Vincent – Cerezo Osaka, Gainare Tottori, FC Gifu – 2007–2008, 2013
Michael den Heijer – Kashiwa Reysol – 2014–2015
Michael McGlinchey – Vegalta Sendai – 2014
Michael Woud – Kyoto Sanga – 2022–
Ryan De Vries – FC Gifu – 2018–2020
Wynton Rufer – JEF United Chiba – 1996

Nigeria 
Adebayo Adigun – Kashiwa Reysol, Tokyo Verdy – 2009–2010
Blessing Eleke – Kashima Antlers – 2022
Chibueze Christian Simon  – Fukushima United – 2021–2022
Emeka Basil – Tiamo Hirakata – 2021–
Kenneth Otabor – Iwate Grulla Morioka – 2021–
Momodu Mutairu – Kawasaki Frontale, Montedio Yamagata – 1996–1999
Michael Obiku – Avispa Fukuoka – 1997–1998
Mikel Agu – Shonan Bellmare – 2022–
Origbaajo Ismaila – Fukushima United, Kyoto Sanga – 2019–2022
Oriola Sunday – Tokushima Vortis − 2022–
Peter Utaka – Shimizu S-Pulse, Sanfrecce Hiroshima, FC Tokyo, Tokushima Vortis, Ventforet Kofu, Kyoto Sanga – 2015–2022
Promise Ugochukwu − YSCC Yokohama − 2020–
Samuel Abiodun Saanumi – Tegevajaro Miyazaki, Veroskronos Tsuno – 2018–

North Korea 
An Yong-hak – Albirex Niigata, Nagoya Grampus, Omiya Ardija, Kashiwa Reysol, Yokohama FC – 2002–2005, 2010–2012, 2014–2017
An Byong-jun – Kawasaki Frontale, JEF United Chiba, Zweigen Kanazawa, Roasso Kumamoto – 2013–2018
Han Ho-gang – Montedio Yamagata, Blaublitz Akita, Yokohama FC – 2016–2021
Han Yong-gi – YSCC Yokohama – 2022
Han Yong-thae – Matsumoto Yamaga, Kagoshima United, Tochigi SC, Iwate Grulla Morioka – 2019–2022
Hwang Song-su – Jubilo Iwata, Thespakusatsu Gunma, Oita Trinita – 2010–2018
Jong Tae-se – Kawasaki Frontale, Shimizu S-Pulse, Albirex Niigata, 'Machida Zelvia – 2006–2010, 2015–2022
Kang Song-ho – Oita Trinita, Shimizu S-Pulse, Kyoto Sanga, Tokyo Verdy, Zweigen Kanazawa – 2010–2014
Kim Jong-song – FC Korea, Jubilo Iwata, Consadole Sapporo – 1987–1998
Kim Ki-su – Mito HollyHock, Fukushima United FC – 2005–2013
Kim Song-gi – Cerezo Osaka, Vissel Kobe, Mito HollyHock, FC Machida Zelvia, Fujieda MYFC, Tochigi City, Nara Club, ReinMeer Aomori – 2011–2021
Kim Song-min – FC Tokyo U-23 – 2019–2020
Kim Song-sun – FC Ryukyu, Nara Club, Veertien Mie – 2018–2019, 2021–
Kim Song-yong – Kyoto Sanga, Thespakusatsu Gunma – 2009–2012
Kim Wi-man – JEF United Chiba, Tokushima Vortis – 2002–2006
Mun In-ju – Gainare Tottori – 2022–
Park Ri-ki – FC Ryukyu, Kochi United SC, FC Osaka, MIO Biwako Shiga – 2015–2021
Park Seung-ri – FC Osaka, Thespakusatsu Gunma, Azul Claro Numazu, Tochigi CIty, Veroskronos Tsuno – 2015–
Ri Han-jae – Sanfrecce Hiroshima, Consadole Sapporo, FC Gifu, FC Machida Zelvia – 2001–2020
Ri Yong-jik – Tokushima Vortis, V-Varen Nagasaki, Kamatamare Sanuki, Tokyo Verdy, FC Ryukyu – 2013–
Ryang Hyon-ju – FC Imabari, Tokyo Musashino United – 2021–
Ryang Yong-gi – Vegalta Sendai, Sagan Tosu – 2004–
Ryang Kyu-sa – Tokyo Verdy, Thespakusatsu Gunma, Fagiano Okayama – 2000, 2003, 2005–2006
Son Jeong-ryun – Avispa Fukuoka, Renofa Yamaguchi – 2010–2014
Son Min-chol – FC Ryukyu, FC Korea – 2009–2012

North Macedonia 
Besart Abdurahimi – Cerezo Osaka – 2016
Blazhe Ilijoski – FC Gifu – 2013
Boban Babunski – Gamba Osaka – 1996–1998
David Babunski – Yokohama F. Marinos, Omiya Ardija – 2017–2020
Dorian Babunski – FC Machida Zelvia, Kagoshima United – 2017–2020
Goce Sedloski – Vegalta Sendai – 2004
Nikola Jakimovski – Nagoya Grampus – 2013
Stevica Ristić – Shonan Bellmare – 2013

Norway 
Fadel Karbon – FC Ryukyu – 2018
Frode Johnsen – Nagoya Grampus, Shimizu S-Pulse – 2006–2010
Ibba Laajab – Yokohama FC, Omiya Ardija – 2016–2022
Marius Høibråten – Urawa Red Diamonds – 2023–
Mushaga Bakenga – Tokushima Vortis – 2021–2022
Tarik Elyounoussi – Shonan Bellmare – 2020–
Tor Hogne Aarøy – JEF United Chiba – 2011–2012
Tore Pedersen – Sanfrecce Hiroshima – 1994–1995

Panama 
Alfredo Anderson – Omiya Ardija – 2001
Jorge Dely Valdés – Consadole Sapporo, Cerezo Osaka, Sagan Tosu, Omiya Ardija, Kawasaki Frontale – 1993–1998, 2001–2003
Óscar Linton – FC Imabari – 2021

Paraguay 
Ángel Ortiz – Shonan Bellmare – 2000
Aureliano Torres – Kyoto Sanga – 2002
Casiano Delvalle – Shonan Bellmare – 2005
Daniel Sanabria – Shonan Bellmare, Kyoto Sanga – 2000, 2002
Derlis Florentín – Mito HollyHock, Consadole Sapporo – 2005
Francisco Arce – Gamba Osaka – 2003
Guido Alvarenga – Kawasaki Frontale – 2000
Jhonattan Matsuoka – Nagoya Grampus, SC Sagamihara, ReinMeer Aomori, Kamatamare Sanuki, Fukuyama City – 2019–
Jorge Salinas – JEF United Chiba – 2017–2018
José Ortigoza – Ventforet Kofu – 2013
Juan Carlos Villamayor – Avispa Fukuoka – 1998–1999
Richard Estigarribia – Kyoto Sanga – 2002
Richart Báez – Avispa Fukuoka – 1996
Roberto Torres – Jubilo Iwata – 1999–2000
Santiago Salcedo – FC Tokyo – 2005–2006

Peru 
David Soria Yoshinari – Consadole Sapporo – 1996–1997
Erick Noriega – Shimizu S-Pulse, Machida Zelvia – 2020–2021
Héctor Takayama – Sagan Tosu
Jorge Hirano – Shonan Bellmare – 1980–1981
Kazuyoshi Shimabuku – Albirex Niigata – 2021–

Philippines 
Jefferson Tabinas – Kawasaki Frontale, FC Gifu, Gamba Osaka, Mito HollyHock – 2017–
Paul Tabinas – Iwate Grulla Morioka – 2021–
Satoshi Otomo – Vegalta Sendai, Sagan Tosu, Yokohama FC, Blaublitz Akita, FC Gifu, Tokyo Musashino City FC, Tokyo 23 FC – 2000–2005, 2006–2009, 2015–2016, 2019

Poland 
Andrzej Kubica – Urawa Red Diamonds, Oita Trinita – 2000, 2001
Filip Piszczek – FC Imabari - 2022–
Jakub Słowik – Vegalta Sendai, FC Tokyo – 2019–
Jakub Świerczok – Nagoya Grampus – 2021–2022
Krzysztof Kaminski – Jubilo Iwata – 2015–2019
Maciej Krakowiak – FC Imabari – 2017–2019
Piotr Świerczewski – Gamba Osaka – 1999
Piotr Sowisz – Kyoto Sanga – 2001
Radosław Kamiński – Fujieda MYFC – 2015
Tomasz Frankowski – Nagoya Grampus – 1996

Portugal 
Alexandre Guedes – Vegalta Sendai, Albirex Niigata – 2020, 2022
Hugo Vieira – Yokohama F. Marinos, Consadole Sapporo – 2017–2018, 2020
Marco Ferreira – Yokohama Flügels – 1998
Miguel Simão – Sanfrecce Hiroshima – 2000	
Paulo Futre – Yokohama Flügels – 1998
Tiago Alves – Montedio Yamagata – 2022–

Qatar 
Ahmed Yasser – Vissel Kobe – 2018–2019
Emerson Sheik – Consadole Sapporo, Kawasaki Frontale, Urawa Red Diamonds – 2000–2005

Romania 
Cosmin Olăroiu – JEF United Chiba – 2000
Gabriel Popescu – JEF United Chiba – 2005
Ovidiu Burcă – JEF United Chiba – 2000
Pavel Badea – Shonan Bellmare, Kashiwa Reysol, Avispa Fukuoka – 1998–2001
Robert Vancea – JEF United Chiba – 1999

Russia 
Akhrik Tsveiba – Gamba Osaka – 1994–1996
Dmitri Radchenko – Jubilo Iwata – 1999–2000 
Igor Lediakhov – Yokohama Flügels – 1998
Ippei Shinozuka – Yokohama F. Marinos, Omiya Ardija, Kashiwa Reysol, Albirex Niigata – 2017–
Yuriy Nikiforov – Urawa Red Diamonds – 2003–2004

Scotland 
Alan Irvine – Sanfrecce Hiroshima – 1989–1990
Austin MacPhee – FC Kariya – 2003–2006
Colin Marshall – Machida Zelvia – 2012
Scott McGarvey – Sanfrecce Hiroshima – 1990–1992
Steve Paterson – Tokyo Verdy – 1984–1986
Steven Tweed – Yokohama FC – 2004–2006

Senegal 
Camara Ibrahima Rene – Jubilo Iwata – 2005

Serbia 
Aleksandar Živković – Jubilo Iwata – 2000–2003
Alen Mašović – FC Machida Zelvia – 2020–2021
Alen Stevanović – Shonan Bellmare – 2018
Bratislav Punoševac – Avispa Fukuoka – 2013–2014
Dragan Dimić – FC Machida Zelvia – 2011–2012
Dragan Mrđa – Shonan Bellmare – 2017–2018
Dragan Stojković – Nagoya Grampus – 1994–2001
Dragiša Binić – Nagoya Grampus, Sagan Tosu – 1994, 1995
Dušan Cvetinović – Yokohama F. Marinos, Tokushima Vortis – 2018–2021
Dušan Petković – Yokohama F. Marinos – 1997—1998
Filip Kljajić – Omiya Ardija – 2020–2021
Gojko Kačar – Cerezo Osaka – 2014
Goran Vasilijević – JEF United Chiba – 1995–1996
Luka Radotic – V-Varen Nagasaki – 2023–
Miodrag Anđelković – Cerezo Osaka – 2004
Nebojša Krupniković – Gamba Osaka, JEF United Chiba – 1997–1998, 2006
Nedeljko Stojišić – Vegalta Sendai, Machida Zelvia – 2021–
Nemanja Kojić – Tokyo Verdy – 2019
Nemanja Vučićević – FC Tokyo – 2013–2014
Nenad Đorđević – JEF United Chiba – 2007
Nenad Živković – Kagoshima United – 2015–2016
Nikola Ašćerić – Tokushima Vortis – 2017
Nikola Vasiljević – Tokushima Vortis – 2017
Radivoje Manić – Cerezo Osaka – 1998
Ranko Despotović – Urawa Red Diamonds – 2011—2013
Slobodan Dubajić – Vegalta Sendai – 1997–2000
Srđa Knežević – V-Varen Nagasaki – 2014
Srđan Baljak – Consadole Sapporo – 2002
Stefan Šćepović – FC Machida Zelvia – 2020
Vlada Avramov – FC Tokyo – 2015

Singapore 
Anders Aplin – Matsumoto Yamaga – 2018
Song Ui-young – Roasso Kumamoto – 2011

Slovakia 
Jozef Gašpar – Vegalta Sendai – 2004
Lubomir Luhovy – Urawa Red Diamonds – 1994
Ľubomír Moravčík – JEF United Chiba – 2002
Marek Špilár – Nagoya Grampus 2006–2007
Miroslav Mentel – Urawa Red Diamonds – 1993–1994

Slovenia 
Alfred Jermaniš – Yokohama Flügels – 1992
Amir Karić – Gamba Osaka – 1997–1998
Ante Šimundža – Vegalta Sendai – 1997
Branko Ilić – Urawa Red Diamonds – 2016
Davorin Kablar – Cerezo Osaka – 2004
Denis Halilović – Yokohama FC – 2016
Klemen Lavrič – Omiya Ardija – 2008–2009
Milan Tučić – Consadole Sapporo – 2021–
Milivoje Novaković – Omiya Ardija, Shimizu S-Pulse, Nagoya Grampus – 2012–2015
Nejc Pečnik – JEF United Chiba, Omiya Ardija, Tochigi SC – 2014–2018
Peter Binkovski – Vegalta Sendai – 1997
Primož Gliha – Yokohama Flügels – 1992
Rok Štraus – Yokohama FC – 2015–2016
Željko Milinovič – JEF United Chiba – 1991–1994
Zlatan Ljubijankić – Omiya Ardija, Urawa Red Diamonds – 2012–2018

South Korea

A 
Ahn Joon-soo – Cerezo Osaka, Cerezo Osaka U-23, Kagoshima United – 2016–2020
Ahn Jung-hwan – Shimizu S-Pulse, Yokohama F. Marinos – 2002–2005
Ahn Young-kyu – Giravanz Kitakyushu – 2013
An Hyo-yeon – Yokohama FC – 2009
An Sun-jin – Mito HollyHock – 2001–2002
An Yong-woo – Sagan Tosu – 2017–2020

B 
Bae Chun-suk – Vissel Kobe – 2011–2012
Bae Dae-won – Tokyo Verdy, FC Machida Zelvia – 2012–2015
Bae Hu-min – Yokohama FC, Azul Claro Numazu – 2013–2015
Bae Seung-jin – Yokohama FC, Thespakusatsu Gunma, Tokushima Vortis – 2007–2012, 2018
Bae Soo-yong – Gamba Osaka, Giravanz Kitakyushu, Kamatamare Sanuki – 2017–2019
Baek Sung-dong – Jubilo Iwata, Sagan Tosu, V-Varen Nagasaki – 2012–2016
Byeon Jun-byum – Sanfrecce Hiroshima, Shimizu S-Pulse, Zweigen Kanazawa, Ventforet Kofu – 2014–2018

C 
Cha Ji-ho – Roasso Kumamoto – 2008–2009
Cha Young-hwan – Tochigi SC, Zweigen Kanazawa – 2012–2015
Chang Woe-ryong – Sagan Tosu – 1989
Cho Byung-kuk – Vegalta Sendai, Jubilo Iwata – 2011–2013
Cho Dong-geon – Sagan Tosu – 2017–2020
Cho Eun-su – FC Ryukyu – 2023–
Cho Hyeong-in – MIO Biwako Shiga – 2022
Cho Jae-jin – Gamba Osaka – 2009–2010
Cho Kwi-jea – Kashiwa Reysol, Urawa Red Diamonds, Vissel Kobe – 1991–1997
Cho Min-woo – V-Varen Nagasaki – 2013, 2015–2016
Cho Sung-hwan – Consadole Sapporo – 2009–2010
Cho Won-hee – Omiya Ardija – 2014
Cho Young-cheol – Yokohama FC, Albirex Niigata, Omiya Ardija, Tiamo Hirakata, Tochigi City – 2007–2014, 2020–2022
Choi Byung-gil – FC Ryukyu – 2017–2018
Choi Dae-shik – Oita Trinita – 1996–1999
Choi Hyun-chan – Renofa Yamaguchi – 2023–
Choi Ji-hun – Zweigen Kanazawa – 2013–2014
Choi Joon-gi – Thespakusatsu Gunma – 2017
Choi Jung-han – Oita Trinita – 2009–2014
Choi Jung-won – Fagiano Okayama – 2018–2020
Choi Ju-yong – Renofa Yamaguchi – 2015
Choi Kun-sik – Roasso Kumamoto, Tochigi SC – 2009–2012
Choi Kyu-baek – V-Varen Nagasaki – 2018–2019
Choi Moon-sik – Oita Trinita – 2001
Choi Seung-in – Shonan Bellmare, Zweigen Kanazawa – 2010–2011
Choi Su-bin – Matsumoto Yamaga – 2012
Choi Sung-keun – Ventforet Kofu, Sagan Tosu, FC Gifu – 2012–2017
Choi Sung-kuk – Kashiwa Reysol – 2005
Choi Sung-yong – Yokohama FC, Thespakusatsu Gunma – 2006–2010
Choi Tae-uk – Shimizu S-Pulse – 2005
Choi Yong-soo – JEF United Chiba, Kyoto Sanga, Jubilo Iwata – 2001–2005
Chong Yong-de – Nagoya Grampus, Cerezo Osaka, Yokohama FC, Consadole Sapporo – 2002–2009

D 
Do Dong-hyun – FC Gifu – 2013–2014

G 
Gang Yoon-goo – Vissel Kobe, Oita Trinita, Ehime FC – 2013–2015
Goh Dong-min – Matsumoto Yamaga, Vanraure Hachinohe – 2017–2021
Gu Sung-yun – Cerezo Osaka, Consadole Sapporo – 2013–2020, 2023–
Gwak Kyung-keun – Urawa Red Diamonds, Fukushima FC – 1994–1997

H 
Ha Dae-sung – FC Tokyo, Nagoya Grampus – 2016
Ha Seok-ju – Cerezo Osaka, Vissel Kobe – 1998–2000
Ha Sung-min – Kyoto Sanga – 2017–2018
Ham Hyun-gi – Oita Trinita – 1993–1994
Ham Yeong-jun – FC Gifu – 2019–2021
Han Chang-joo – Kamatamare Sanuki – 2015–2016
Han Eui-kwon – Fagiano Okayama – 2022–
Han Hee-hoon – Tochigi SC – 2015
Han Ho-dong – Thespakusatsu Gunma, Tonan Maebashi – 2017
Han Kook-young – Shonan Bellmare, Kashiwa Reysol – 2010–2014
Han Sang-woon – Jubilo Iwata – 2012
Han Seung-gang – Fukuyama City – 2021–
Han Seung-hyeong – Matsumoto Yamaga, Kataller Toyama, Nara Club – 2016–2018
Heo Yong-joon – Vegalta Sendai – 2023–
Hong Myung-bo – Shonan Bellmare, Kashiwa Reysol – 1997–2001
Hong Seok – FC Osaka, FC Tokushima – 2020–
Hong Soon-hak – FC Osaka – 2018
Hwang Dae-seong – Kyoto Sanga, Tokyo United – 2012–2018
Hwang Jin-sung – Kyoto Sanga, Fagiano Okayama – 2015
Hwang Seok-ho – Sanfrecce hiroshima, Kashima Antlers, Shimizu S-Pulse, Sagan Tosu – 2012–2016, 2018–
Hwang Soon-min – Shonan Bellmare – 2011
Hwang Sun-hong – Cerezo Osaka, Kashiwa Reysol – 1998–2002
Hwang Te-song – Kyoto Sanga – 2012–2015
Hwang Ui-jo – Gamba Osaka – 2017–2019
Hwangbo Kwan – Oita Trinita – 1996–1997

I 
Im Dong-hyeon – Gainare Tottori – 2014

J 
Jang Hyun-soo – FC Tokyo – 2012–2013, 2017–2019
Jang Hyun-soo – Iwate Grulla Morioka – 2022–
Jang Min-gyu – JEF United Chiba, Machida Zelvia – 2020–
Jang Seok-won – Fagiano Okayama – 2017
Jeon San-hae – FC Gifu, Suzuka Point Getters, Kamatamare Sanuki – 2018–2020
Jeon Ji-wan – FC Ryukyu – 2023–
Jeong Chung-geun – Yokohama FC, Fagiano Okayama, Machida Zelvia – 2016–2020
Jeong Shung-hun – Consadole Sapporo – 2014
Jo Jin-woo – Matsumoto Yamaga – 2018–2019
Jo Sung-jin – Roasso Kumamoto, Kamatamare Sanuki, Consadole Sapporo – 2009–2013
Ju Se-jong – Gamba Osaka – 2021–2022
Jung Han-cheol – Machida Zelvia, YSCC Yokohama, FC Imabari – 2018–2021
Jung Hoon-sung – V-Varen Nagasaki, Iwate Grulla Morioka – 2013–2015
Jung Seung-hyun – Sagan Tosu, Kashima Antlers – 2017–2019
Jung Sung-ryong – Kawasaki Frontale – 2016–
Jung Woo-young – Kyoto Sanga, Jubilo Iwata, Vissel Kobe – 2011–2015, 2018

K 
Kang Soo-il – Thespakusatsu Gunma, Tokyo Verdy – 2017, 2019
Kim Bo-kyung – Cerezo Osaka, Oita Trinita, Matsumoto Yamaga, Kashiwa Reysol – 2010–2012, 2015, 2017–2019
Kim Byeom-yong – Montedio Yamagata, Sanfrecce Hiroshima, Shimizu S-Pulse, JEF United Chiba – 2013–2018
Kim Byeong-yeon – Roasso Kumamoto – 2014–2015
Kim Byung-soo – Cosmo Oil Yokkaichi, Oita Trinita – 1993–1997
Kim Byung-suk – Montedio Yamagata, Sagan Tosu – 2009–2011
Kim Chan-young – Tonan Maebashi – 2013
Kim Chang-hun – Oita Trinita – 2012
Kim Chang-soo – Kashiwa Reysol – 2013–2015
Kim Chol-ho – Kyoto Sanga, Thespakusatsu Gunma – 2017–2018
Kim Dong-wook – Oita Trinita – 2016
Kim Dae-eui – JEF United Chiba – 1998
Kim Do-hoon – Vissel Kobe – 1998–1999
Kim Do-keun – Tokyo Verdy, Cerezo Osaka – 2000–2001
Kim Do-kyun – Kyoto Sanga – 2004
Kim Dong-chan – FC Korea, Mito HollyHock – 2005–2007
Kim Dong-gwon – FC Gifu, FC Osaka – 2012
Kim Dong-hee – Giravanz Kitakyushu – 2013
Kim Dong-hyun – Oita Trinita – 2003
Kim Dong-sub – Oita Trinita – 2003
Kim Eun-jung – Vegalta Sendai – 2003
Kim Geun-chul – Jubilo Iwata, Shonan Bellmare – 2002–2004
Kim Gun-hee – Consadole Sapporo – 2022–
Kim Ho-nam – Sagan Tosu – 2010
Kim Hong-yeon – Fukushima United, Iwate Grulla Morioka, Vanraure Hachinohe, Nara Club – 2013–2020
Kim Hwang-jung – JEF United Chiba, Ventforet Kofu – 1998–2001
Kim Hyun-hun – JEF United Chiba, Avispa Fukuoka – 2013–2016
Kim Hyun-seok (footballer) – Tokyo Verdy – 2000
Kim Hyun-sung – Shimizu S-Pulse – 2012
Kim Jae-hoan – Consadole Sapporo – 2012
Kim Jeong-hun – Sagan Tosu, Renaiss Koka, MIO Biwako Shiga – 2006–2009
Kim Jeong-hyun – Oita Trinita – 2012–2015
Kim Jeong-seok – Sanfrecce Hiroshima – 2013–2015
Kim Jin-hyeon – Cerezo Osaka – 2009–
Kim Jin-kyu – Jubilo Iwata, Ventforet Kofu, Fagiano Okayama – 2005–2006, 2011, 2016
Kim Jin-su – Albirex Niigata – 2012–2014
Kim Jong-min – Tokushima Vortis, Fagiano Okayama, Iwate Grulla Morioka – 2011–2015, 2017, 2022
Kim Jong-pil – Giravanz Kitakyushu, Tokyo Verdy, Shonan Bellmare, Tokushima Vortis – 2011–2018
Kim Jung-hyun – FC Gifu – 2012
Kim Jung-woo – Nagoya Grampus – 2006–2007
Kim Jung-ya – Gamba Osaka, Sagan Tosu, Gamba Osaka U-23, Vegalta Sendai, Fujieda MYFC – 2011–2021
Kim Kong-chyong – Fukushima United, FC Merry – 2009–2020
Kim Kun-hoan – Yokohama F. Marinos, Montedio Yamagata, Sagan Tosu, Albirex Niigata – 2008–2013
Kim Kwang-min – Fagiano Okayama, Fukushima United – 2008–2009, 2011–2013
Kim Kyung-jun – Tokushima Vortis – 2015–2016
Kim Min-hyeok – Sagan Tosu – 2014–2018
Kim Min-ho – Sagan Tosu, Nagano Parceiro – 2021– 
Kim Min-je – Avispa Fukuoka, Ehime FC – 2011–2014
Kim Min-jun – Shonan Bellmare, Fukushima United – 2019–2020
Kim Min-kyun – Fagiano Okayama – 2011–2012, 2013
Kim Min-tae – Vegalta Sendai, Consadole Sapporo, Nagoya Grampus, Kashima Antlers – 2015–
Kim Min-woo – Sagan Tosu – 2010–2016
Kim Myung-hwi – JEF United Chiba, Ventforet Kofu, Sagawa Shiga, Cento Cuore Harima, ALO's Hokuriku, Kataller Toyama, Sagan Tosu – 2000–2001, 2003–2011
Kim Nam-il – Vissel Kobe, Kyoto Sanga – 2008–2009, 2015
Kim Sang-woo – Tokushima Vortis – 2006–2007
Kim Seong-ju – Albirex Niigata, Kataller Toyama – 2012–2014
Kim Seung-gyu – Vissel Kobe, Kashiwa Reysol – 2016–2022
Kim Seung-yong – Gamba Osaka – 2011
Kim Shin-young – Cerezo Osaka, Sagan Tosu, Ventforet Kofu, Ehime FC – 2007–2012
Kim Sun-min – Gainare Tottori – 2011–2012
Kim Sung-joon – Cerezo Osaka – 2014
Kim Sung-kil – Oita Trinita – 2002–2003
Kim Tae-hyeon – Vegalta Sendai – 2022–
Kim Tae-woo – Suzuka Point Getters – 2021–
Kim Tae-yeon – Vissel Kobe, Ehime FC, Mito HollyHock, Fagiano Okayama, Tokyo Verdy, Roasso Kumamoto – 2006–2011, 2016
Kim Yeong-gi – Shonan Bellmare, Oita Trinita, Avispa Fukuoka, Nagano Parceiro – 2007–2016
Kim Yong-gi – Mito HollyHock – 2012–2013
Kim Yoo-jin – Sagan Tosu, Yokohama FC – 2006, 2011
Kim Young-gwon – FC Tokyo, Omiya Ardija, Gamba Osaka – 2010–2012, 2019–2021
Kim Young-heon – Zweigen Kanazawa – 2016
Ko Jeong-woon – Cerezo Osaka – 1997–1998
Ko Jong-soo – Kyoto Sanga – 2003
Ko Kyung-joon – Tokyo Verdy – 2015
Ko Kyung-te – Nagano Parceiro, Iwate Grulla Morioka, Briobecca Urayasu, Tokyo Musashino United – 2014–2022
Koo Bon-hyeok – Montedio Yamagata, Tegevajaro Miyazaki – 2016–2018
Kwak Hee-ju – FC Tokyo – 2014
Kwak Tae-hwi – Kyoto Sanga – 2010–2011
Kweon Han-jin – Kashiwa Reysol, Shonan Bellmare, Thespakusatsu Gunma, Roasso Kumamoto – 2011–2015
Kwon Kyung-won – Gamba Osaka – 2022–
Kwon Seok-geun – Roasso Kumamoto – 2008
Kwon Young-ho – Fujieda MYFC – 2017
Kwon Young-jin – Mito HollyHock – 2017
Kwoun Sun-tae – Kashima Antlers – 2017–

L 
Lee Chang-gang – Fagiano Okayama – 2007–2011
Lee Chun-soo – Omiya Ardija – 2010–2011
Lee Dae-heon – Sanfrecce Hiroshima, V-Varen Nagasaki, Tochigi SC – 2012–2015
Lee Do-hyung – FC Imabari – 2020–2022
Lee Dong-myung – Fagiano Okayama, Oita Trinita – 2010–2012
Lee Ho – Omiya Ardija – 2010
Lee Ho-seung – Consadole Sapporo, Shonan Bellmare – 2011–2015
Lee Jae-min – Vissel Kobe – 2010–2011
Lee Je-seung – Montedio Yamagata – 2016–2017
Lee Ji-seong – FC Ryukyu – 2020
Lim Jin-woo – Roasso Kumamoto – 2017–2018
Lee Jong-ho – V-Varen Nagasaki – 2019
Lee Jong-min – Montedio Yamagata, Tochigi SC, Avispa Fukuoka, Matsumoto Yamaga – 2006, 2009, 2010–2012
Lee Joo-young – Montedio Yamagata, Tochigi SC, JEF United Chiba, Kamatamare Sanuki – 2013–2017
Lee Jun-hyeob – Matsumoto Yamaga – 2014–2016
Lee Jung-soo – Kyoto Sanga, Kashima Antlers – 2009–2010
Lee Kang-uk – Thespakusatsu Gunma – 2016–2017
Lee Keun-ho – Jubilo Iwata, Gamba Osaka – 2009–2011
Lee Ki-je – Shimizu S-Pulse – 2012–2014
Lee Kwang-seon – Vissel Kobe, Avispa Fukuoka – 2012–2015
Lee Kyung-tae – Fagiano Okayama, FC Ryukyu, Kawasaki Frontale – 2017–2021
Lee Min-soo – Shonan Bellmare, Shimizu S-Pulse, Tochigi SC, FC Machida Zelvia – 2012–2015
Lee Myung-jae – Albirex Niigata – 2014
Lee Rae-jun – Tochigi SC – 2019
Lee Sang-min – V-Varen Nagasaki – 2019
Lee Seung-hee – Nagoya Grampus – 2016
Lee Seung-yeoul – Gamba Osaka – 2012
Lee Tae-ho – Montedio Yamagata, Tochigi SC, JEF United Chiba, Kamatamare Sanuki – 2013–2017 
Lee Woo-jin – Tokyo Verdy, Jubilo Iwata, FC Machida Zelvia – 2004–2005, 2010–2012
Lee Woo-young – Oita Trinita – 1996–1997
Lee Yong-jae – V-Varen Nagasaki, Kyoto Sanga, Fagiano Okayama – 2014–2021
Lee Yun-oh – Vegalta Sendai, Fukushima United, Gamba Osaka U-23 – 2017–2020
Lim Jeung-bin – Thespakusatsu Gunma – 2016
Lim Jin-woo – Roasso Kumamoto – 2017–2018
Lim Seung-gyeom – Nagoya Grampus, Oita Trinita – 2017–2018
Lim You-hwan – Kyoto Sanga, Albirex Niigata, Tokyo Verdy – 2004–2005, 2015–2016

M 
Min Seong-jun – Montedio Yamagata – 2020–2021
Moon Je-chun – Tokyo Verdy – 2005–2006
Moon Joo-won – Sagan Tosu – 2010
Mun Kyung-gun – Oita Trinita – 2017–2021

N 
Na Sang-ho – FC Tokyo – 2019–2021
Na Sung-soo – Yokohama FC, Kagoshima United – 2012–2018
Nam Il-woo – Giravanz Kitakyushu – 2013
Nam Seung-woo – JEF United Chiba – 2013–2014
Noh Hyung-goo – Roasso Kumamoto – 2013
Noh Jung-yoon – Sanfrecce Hiroshima, Cerezo Osaka, Avispa Fukuoka – 1993–2002

O 
Oh Beom-seok – Yokohama FC – 2007
Oh Chang-hyun – Avispa Fukuoka, V-Varen Nagasaki – 2012–2014
Oh Jae-suk – Gamba Osaka, Gamba Osaka U-23, FC Tokyo, Nagoya Grampus – 2013–2020
Oh Jang-eun – FC Tokyo – 2002–2004
Oh Se-hun – Shimizu S-Pulse – 2022–
Oh Seung-hoon – Kyoto Sanga – 2013–2014

P 
Pak Yong-ho – Sagan Tosu – 1997–2000
Park Chan-yong – Ehime FC, Renofa Yamaguchi, Kamatamare Sanuki – 2015–2018
Park Dong-hyuk – Gamba Osaka, Kashiwa Reysol – 2009–2011
Park Eui-jeong – Kashima Antlers – 2023–
Park Gi-dong – FC Gifu – 2010
Park Hyung-jin – Sanfrecce Hiroshima, Tochigi SC, V-Varen Nagasaki, Fagiano Okayama – 2013–2017
Park Jeong-su – Yokohama F. Marinos, Kashiwa Reysol, Sagan Tosu – 2018–2020
Park Ji-sung – Kyoto Sanga – 2000–2003
Park Jin-soo – Consadole Sapporo – 2010
Park Jong-jin – JEF United Chiba, JEF Reserves, Mito HollyHock – 2007–2008
Park Joo-ho – Mito HollyHock, Kashima Antlers, Jubilo Iwata – 2008–2011
Park Joon-kyung – FC Gifu – 2009–2010
Park Ju-sung – Vegalta Sendai – 2009–2012
Park Jung-hae – Sagan Tosu – 2008
Park Jung-soo – Sagan Tosu – 2010
Park Kang-jo – Kyoto Sanga, Vissel Kobe – 1998–1999, 2003–2012
Park Keon-woo – Sagan Tosu – 2022–
Park Kun – Avispa Fukuoka, Nagano Parceiro, Thespakusatsu Gunma – 2013–2017 
Park Kun-ha – Kashiwa Reysol – 2000
Park Kwang-il – Matsumoto Yamaga, Mito HollyHock, Ehime FC – 2013–2016
Park Kyung-hwan – Shonan Bellmare – 1998
Park Seong-su – Ehime FC, FC Gifu – 2015–2020
Park Soo-bin – FC Imabari – 2022–
Park Sung-ho – Vegalta Sendai, Yokohama FC – 2010, 2014
Park Tae-hong – Yokohama FC, Kataller Toyama – 2011–2015
Park Tae-hwan – Shonan Bellmare, Verspah Oita – 2016–2018
Park Won-jae – Omiya Ardija – 2009
Park Yoon-ki – Sanfrecce Hiroshima – 1988

R 
Rio Hyeon – Tokushima Vortis – 2022–
Ryu Myeong-gi – JEF United Chiba – 2010–2011

S 
Seo Kwan-soo – FC Gifu – 2009
Seo Man-hee – FC Korea, Gainare Tottori, Ehime FC – 2007–2009
Seo Yong-duk – Omiya Ardija, FC Tokyo, Kataller Toyama – 2009–2011, 2014
Shin Won-ho – Gamba Osaka U-23, Gamba Osaka – 2020–2022
Sin Byung-ho – Yokohama F. Marinos, Mito HollyHock – 2000–2001
Song Bum-keun – Shonan Bellmare – 2023–
Song Han-ki – Shonan Bellmare, Kamatamare Sanuki – 2011, 2014
Song In-young – Roasso Kumamoto – 2011
Song Ju-hun – Albirex Niigata, Mito HollyHock – 2014–2018
Song Jun-su – MIO Biwako Shiga, Ococias Kyoto AC – 2021– 
Song Young-min – V-Varen Nagasaki, Kamatamare Sanuki – 2017–2019
Son Se-hwan – Tokushima Vortis – 2014–2016

T 
Tae Yoon – Vissel Kobe – 2007
Taiga Son – Sagan Tosu, Zweigen Kanazawa – 2021–

W 
Won Du-jae – Avispa Fukuoka – 2017–2019
Woo Sang-ho – FC Gifu, Ehime FC, Tochigi SC, FC Osaka – 2018–2020, 2022–

Y 
Yang Dong-hyeon – Cerezo Osaka – 2018–2019
Yang Hae-joon – Kataller Toyama – 2013–2014
Yang Han-been – Cerezo Osaka – 2023–
Yang Sang-jun – Roasso Kumamoto – 2017–2018
Yeo Hyo-jin – Tochigi SC – 2010
Yeo Sung-hae – Sagan Tosu, Matsumoto Yamaga, Thespakusatsu Gunma – 2010–2014, 2017
Yeon Je-min – Kagoshima United – 2019
Yoo Dae-hyun – Tochigi SC, FC Machida Zelvia – 2012–2013
Yoo Hyun – Tochigi SC – 2019
Yoo Sang-chul – Yokohama F. Marinos, Kashiwa Reysol – 1999–2000, 2002–2004
Yoon Jong-hwan – Cerezo Osaka, Sagan Tosu – 2000–2002, 2006–2007
Yoon Jong-min – Japan Soccer College, FC Osaka, Kochi United – 2019–
Yoon Seon-ho – Kamatamare Sanuki, Kochi United SC – 2017–2018
Yoon Shin-young – Renofa Yamaguchi – 2016
Yoon Sung-yeul – FC Machida Zelvia, Matsumoto Yamaga – 2011–2014
Yoon Yoong-seung – Mito HollyHock, Thespakusatsu Gunma, Vonds Ichihara, Tokyo Musashino United – 2014–2017
Yu In-soo – FC Tokyo, FC Tokyo U-23, Avispa Fukuoka – 2016–2019
Yu Hyo-jin – Yokohama FC – 2009
Yu Yong-hyeon – Fagiano Okayama, Kochi United – 2019–2022
Yun Il-lok – Yokohama F. Marinos – 2018–2019
Yun Suk-young – Kashiwa Reysol – 2017–2020

Spain 
Albert Tomàs – Vissel Kobe − 1998−1999
Álex Barrera – FC Ryukyu – 2022
Andoni Goikoetxea – Yokohama F. Marinos – 1998
Andrés Iniesta – Vissel Kobe – 2018–
Arnau Riera – Nara Club – 2022–
Bojan Krkić – Vissel Kobe – 2021–2022
Carlos Gutiérrez – Avispa Fukuoka, Tochigi SC, Machida Zelvia – 2020–
Carlos Martínez Rodríguez – Tokyo Verdy – 2017–2018
David Barral – Tokushima Vortis – 2018
David Concha – Gamba Osaka – 2019
David Villa – Vissel Kobe – 2019
Fernando Torres – Sagan Tosu – 2018–2019
Francisco Sandaza – FC Tokyo – 2015–2016
Isaac Cuenca – Sagan Tosu, Vegalta Sendai – 2019–2021
Jairo Morillas – V-Varen Nagasaki – 2018–2019
Jon Ander Serantes – Avispa Fukuoka, FC Imabari – 2019–2020, 2023–
José Aurelio Suárez – Tokushima Vortis – 2022–
Julio Salinas – Yokohama F. Marinos – 1997–1998
Juanma – V-Varen Nagasaki, Omiya Ardija, Avispa Fukuoka – 2017–
Markel Susaeta – Gamba Osaka – 2019–2020
Miguel Pallardó – V-Varen Nagasaki – 2017
Osmar Barba – Cerezo Osaka – 2018
Raúl Amarilla – Yokohama Flügels – 1993–1994
Pablo Maqueda – Avispa Fukuoka – 1997–1998
Pedro Manzi – Albirex Niigata – 2020
Sergi Samper – Vissel Kobe – 2019–
Sergio Arenas – Suzuka Unlimited FC – 2019–2021
Sisi – FC Gifu, Tokushima Vortis, Ehime FC – 2017–2020
Txiki Begiristain – Urawa Red Diamonds – 1997–1999
Víctor Ibáñez Pascual – FC Gifu, SC Sagamihara, Montedio Yamagata, Matsumoto Yamaga – 2017–

Suriname 
Warner Hahn – Kyoto Sanga – 2023–

Sweden 
David Moberg Karlsson – Urawa Red Diamonds - 2022–
Emil Salomonsson – Sanfrecce Hiroshima, Avispa Fukuoka – 2019–2021
Freddie Ljungberg – Shimizu S-Pulse – 2011–2012
Lee Baxter – Vissel Kobe – 1995–1997
Ludvig Öhman – Nagoya Grampus – 2016
Jan Jönsson – Sanfrecce Hiroshima – 1993
Jean-Paul Vonderburg – Sanfrecce Hiroshima – 1993
Robin Simović – Nagoya Grampus, Omiya Ardija – 2016–2020

Switzerland 
Johnny Leoni – Nagano Parceiro, Tochigi SC – 2016–2018
Nassim Ben Khalifa - Sanfrecce Hiroshima - 2022–
Thomas Bickel – Vissel Kobe – 1995–1997

Thailand 
Adul Lahsoh – Gainare Tottori – 2008
Chakkit Laptrakul – Tokushima Vortis – 2019
Chanathip Songkrasin – Consadole Sapporo, Kawasaki Frontale – 2017–
Chaowat Veerachat – Cerezo Osaka U-23, Cerezo Osaka – 2018, 2022
Chayathorn Tapsuvanavon – FC Tokyo U-23 – 2020
Jakkit Wachpirom – FC Tokyo – 2018
Kawin Thamsatchanan – Consadole Sapporo – 2020
Natee Thongsookkaew – Gamba Osaka – 1989–1990
Nattawut Suksum – FC Tokyo – 2019
Phongrawit Jantawong – Cerezo Osaka U-23 – 2019
Sittichok Paso – Kagoshima United, FC Ryukyu – 2017, 2021–2022
Supachok Sarachat – Consadole Sapporo – 2022–
Tawan Khotrsupho – Cerezo Osaka U-23 – 2019
Teerasil Dangda – Sanfrecce Hiroshima, Shimizu S-Pulse – 2018, 2020
Theerathon Bunmathan – Vissel Kobe, Yokohama F. Marinos – 2018–2021
Thitipan Puangchan – Oita Trinita – 2019
Vorawan Chitavanich – Ehime FC – 1985
Witthaya Laohakul – Gamba Osaka – 1986–1987

Timor Leste 
Fagio Augusto – Tokyo Musashino City FC – 2016
Murilo de Almeida – Oita Trinita, Nagano Parceiro – 2015
Wellington Rocha – FC Gifu – 2016

Trinidad and Tobago 
Silvio Spann – Yokohama FC – 2005

Tunisia 
Issam Jebali – Gamba Osaka – 2023–
Lassad Nouioui – FC Tokyo – 2015
Ziad Tlemçani – Vissel Kobe – 1995–1997

Turkey 
Alpay Özalan – Urawa Red Diamonds – 2004–2005
Eren Albayrak – Jubilo Iwata – 2018–2019
Fuat Usta – Omiya Ardija – 2002
İlhan Mansız – Vissel Kobe – 2004
Ömer Tokaç – Shonan Bellmare, Fukushima United FC, Tochigi SC – 2019–2022

Ukraine 
Oleh Protasov – Gamba Osaka – 1994–1996
Serhiy Skachenko – Sanfrecce Hiroshima – 2001
Vitaliy Parakhnevych – Shonan Bellmare – 2000

United States 
Ansger Otto – Gainare Tottori – 2013
Brian Waltrip – Kyoto Sanga – 2010–2012
Dan Calichman – Sanfrecce Hiroshima – 1990–1993
Mobi Fehr – SC Sagamihara – 2014–2015
Steven Lenhart – FC Imabari – 2017
Piakai Henkel – Fagiano Okayama – 2013–2014
Ray Takada – Rovers Kisarazu, FC Tokushima – 2022–
Tom Byer – Kashiwa Reysol – 1986–1987

Uruguay 
Álvaro Enrique Peña – Montedio Yamagata – 2013
Diego Forlán – Cerezo Osaka – 2013–2014
Eduardo Acevedo – Consadole Sapporo – 1992
Fernando Picun – Urawa Red Diamonds – 1999–2000
Gonzalo González – Albirex Niigata – 2020–2021
Marcelo Lipatín – Yokohama F. Marinos – 2001
Pedro Manzi – Albirex Niigata – 2020
Pedro Pedrucci – Consadole Sapporo – 1990–1995
Raul Otero – Consadole Sapporo – 1996
Renzo Lopez – Kyoto Sanga, Sagan Tosu – 2018, 2020
Santiago Ostolaza – Kyoto Sanga – 1994

Uzbekistan 
Dostonbek Tursunov – Renofa Yamaguchi FC – 2019
Fozil Musaev – Jubilo Iwata – 2017–2021
Oleg Pashinin – Sanfrecce Hiroshima – 2001
Zabikhillo Urinboev – Tokushima Vortis – 2019–2020

Venezuela 
Williams Velásquez – JEF United Chiba – 2019

Vietnam 
Bùi Ngọc Long – Azul Claro Numazu – 2022
Đặng Văn Lâm – Cerezo Osaka – 2021–2022
Lê Công Vinh – Consadole Sapporo – 2013
Nguyễn Công Phượng – Mito Hollyhock, Yokohama FC – 2016, 2023–
Nguyễn Ngọc Hậu – Azul Claro Numazu – 2022
Nguyễn Văn Sơn – Azul Claro Numazu – 2022
Nguyễn Tuấn Anh – Yokohama FC – 2016
Phạm Văn Luân – FC Ryukyu – 2022
Vũ Hồng Quân – FC Ryukyu – 2022

Wales 
Mark Bowen – Shimizu S-Pulse – 1997

See also 
 List of Japan international footballers born outside Japan

References and notes
Notes

External links
 

Foreign J1 League players
Foreign footballers
Japan
Association football player non-biographical articles